= Mosaic =

Image made from small colored tiles

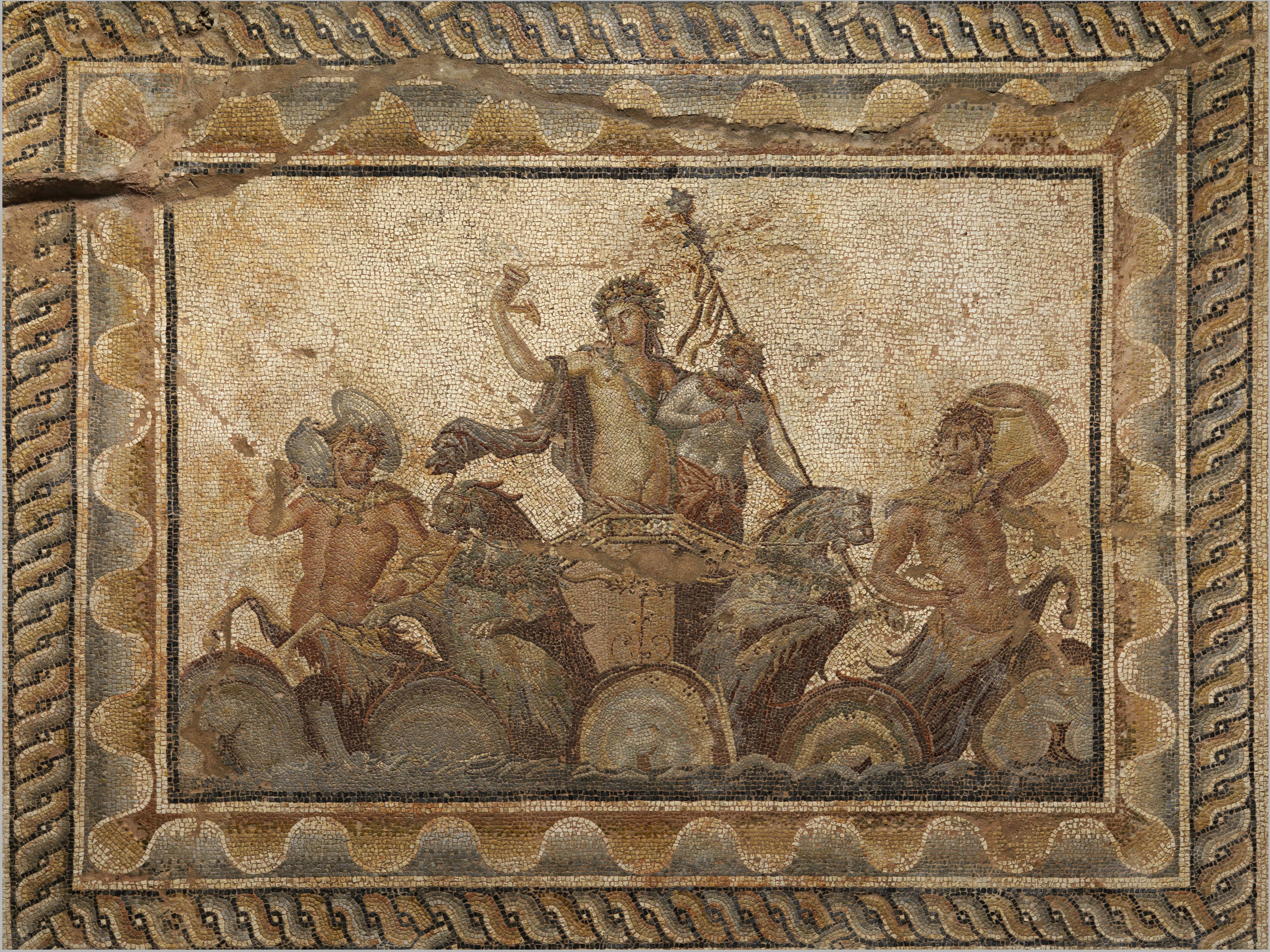
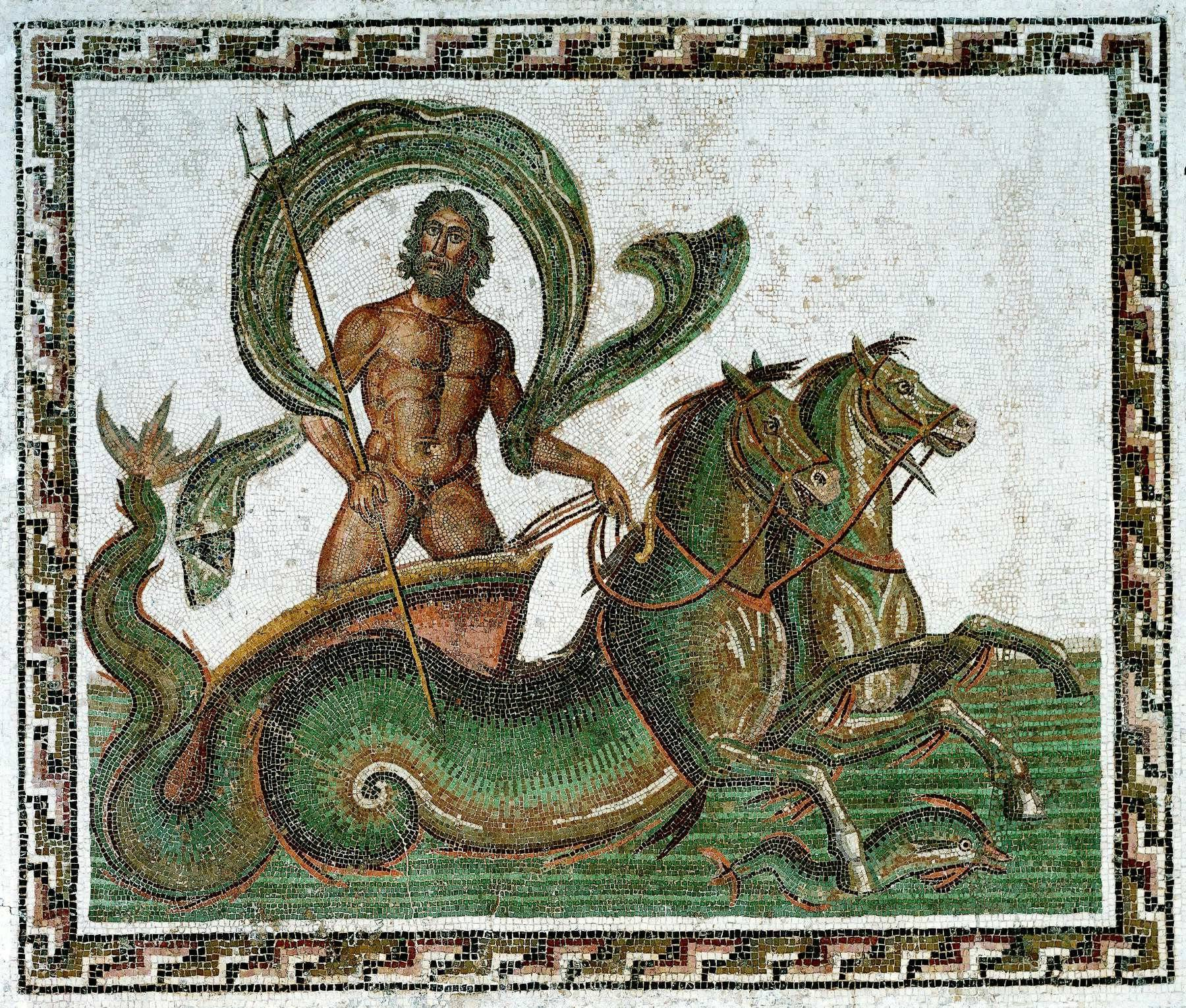
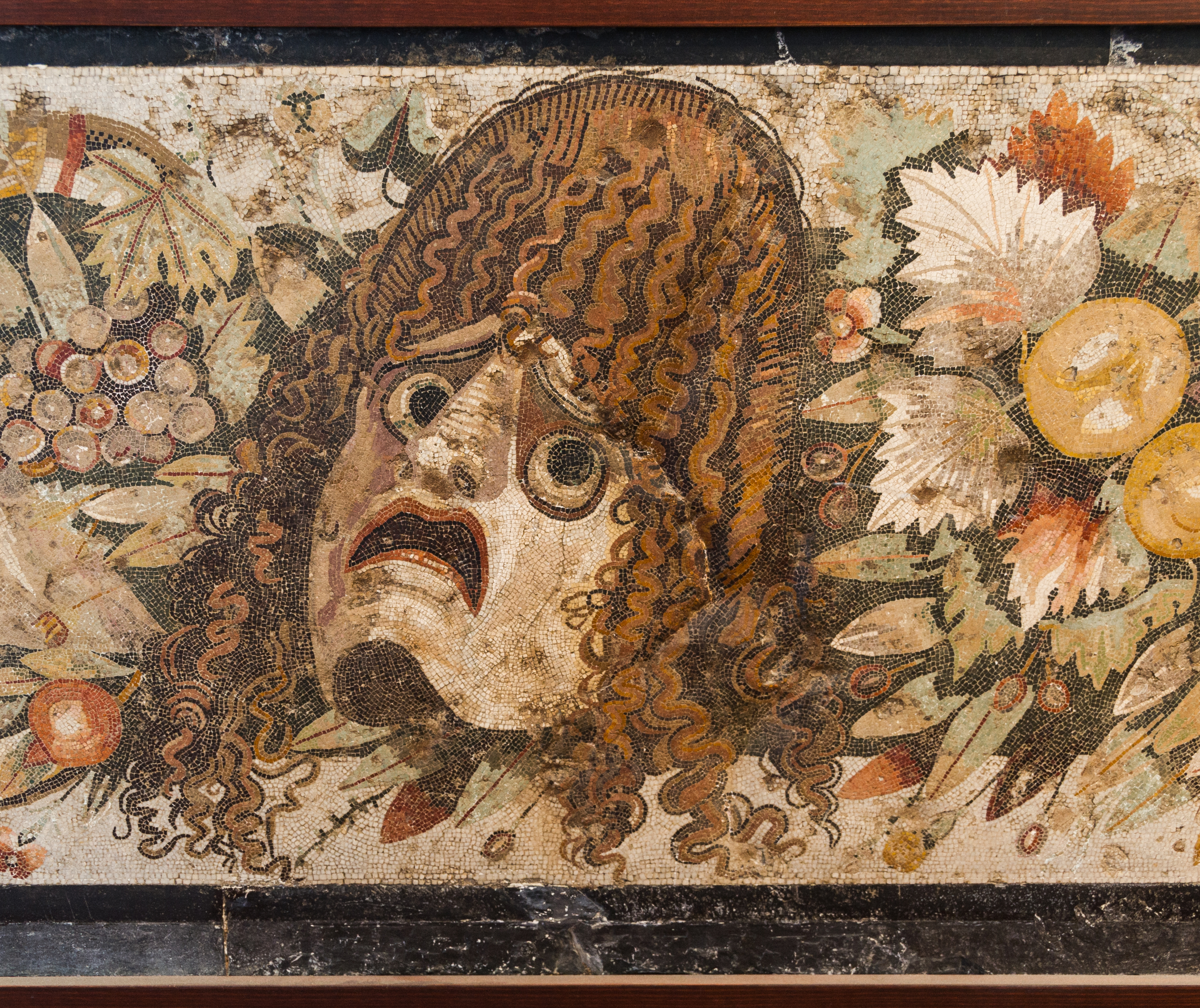
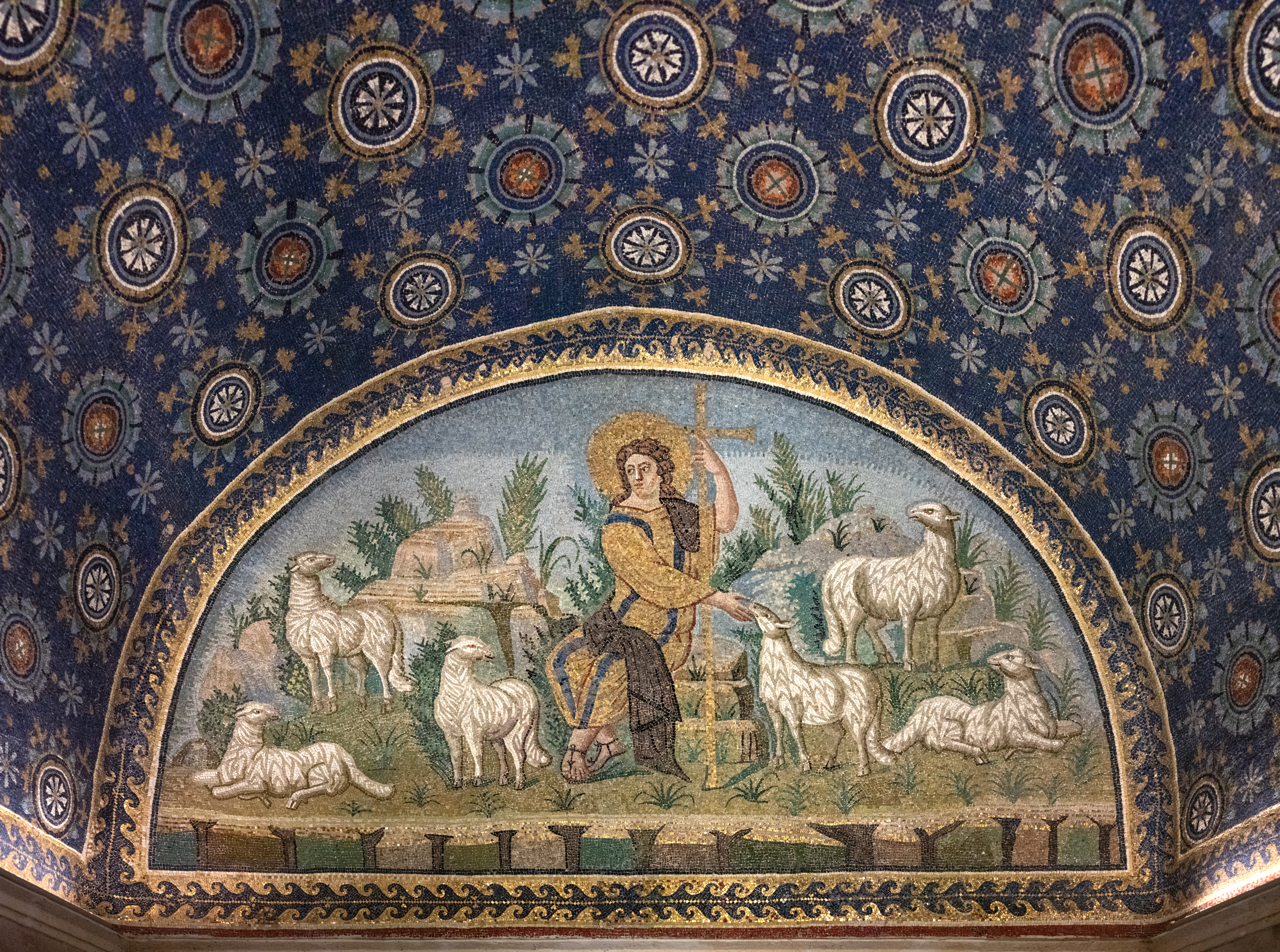
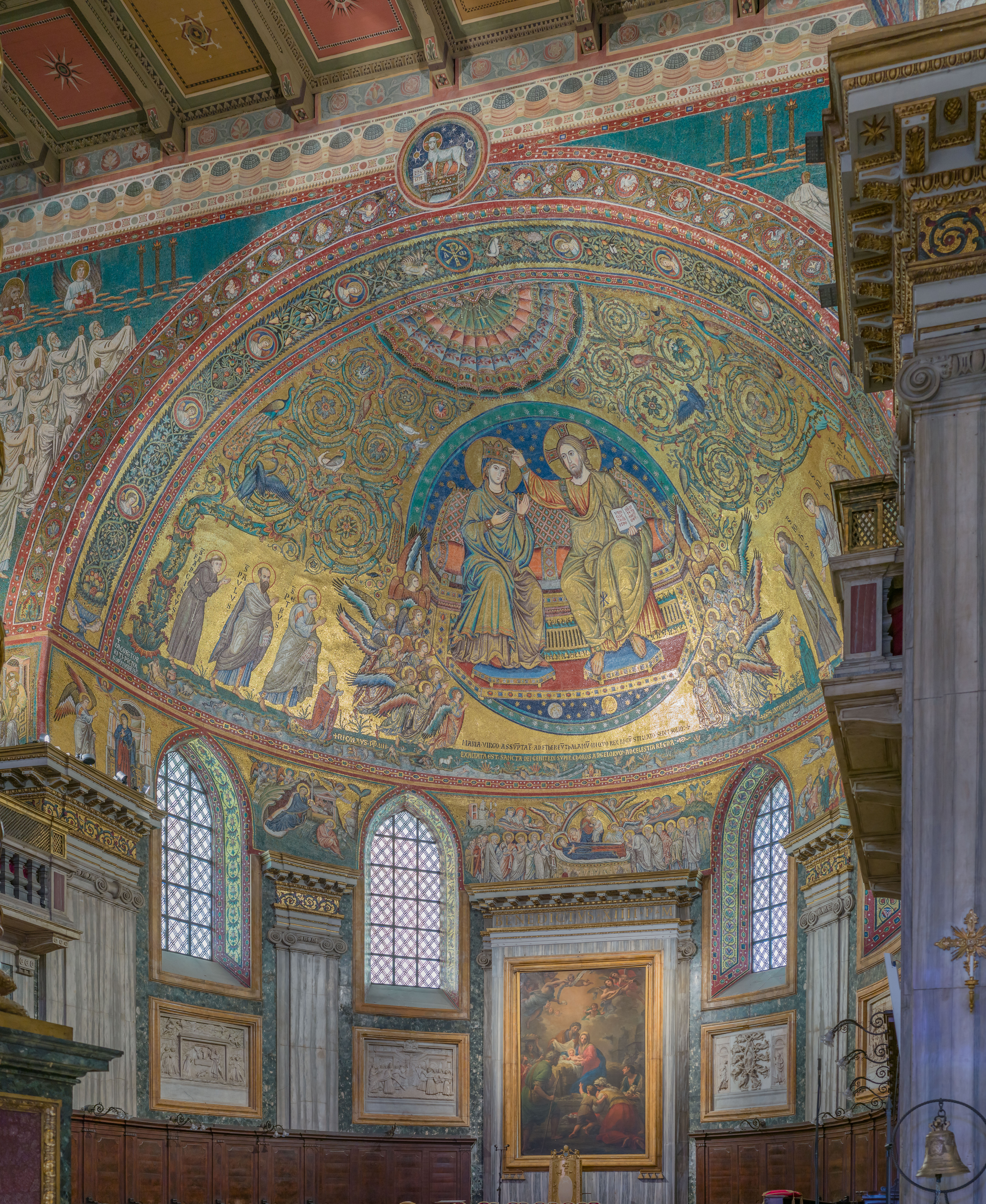
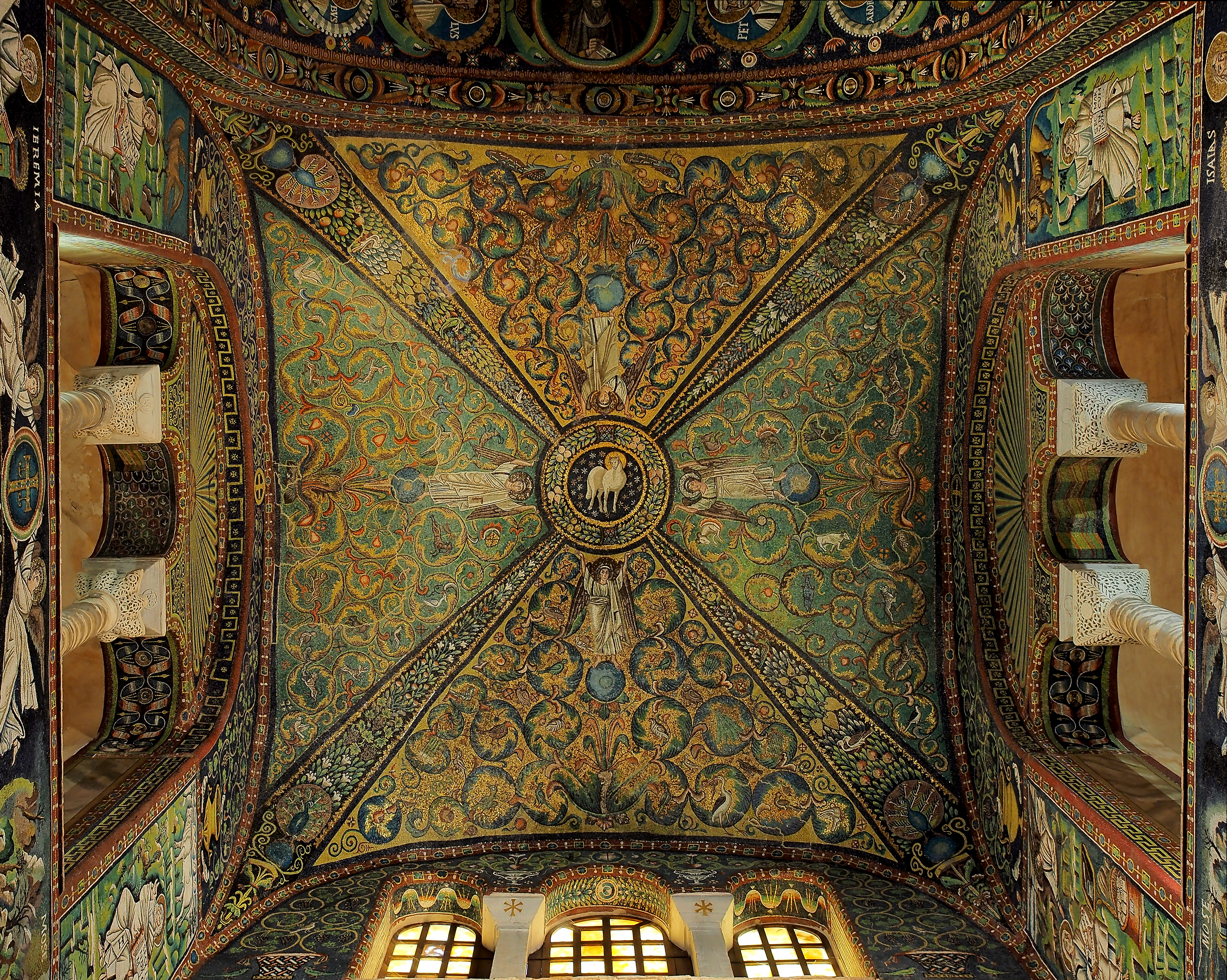
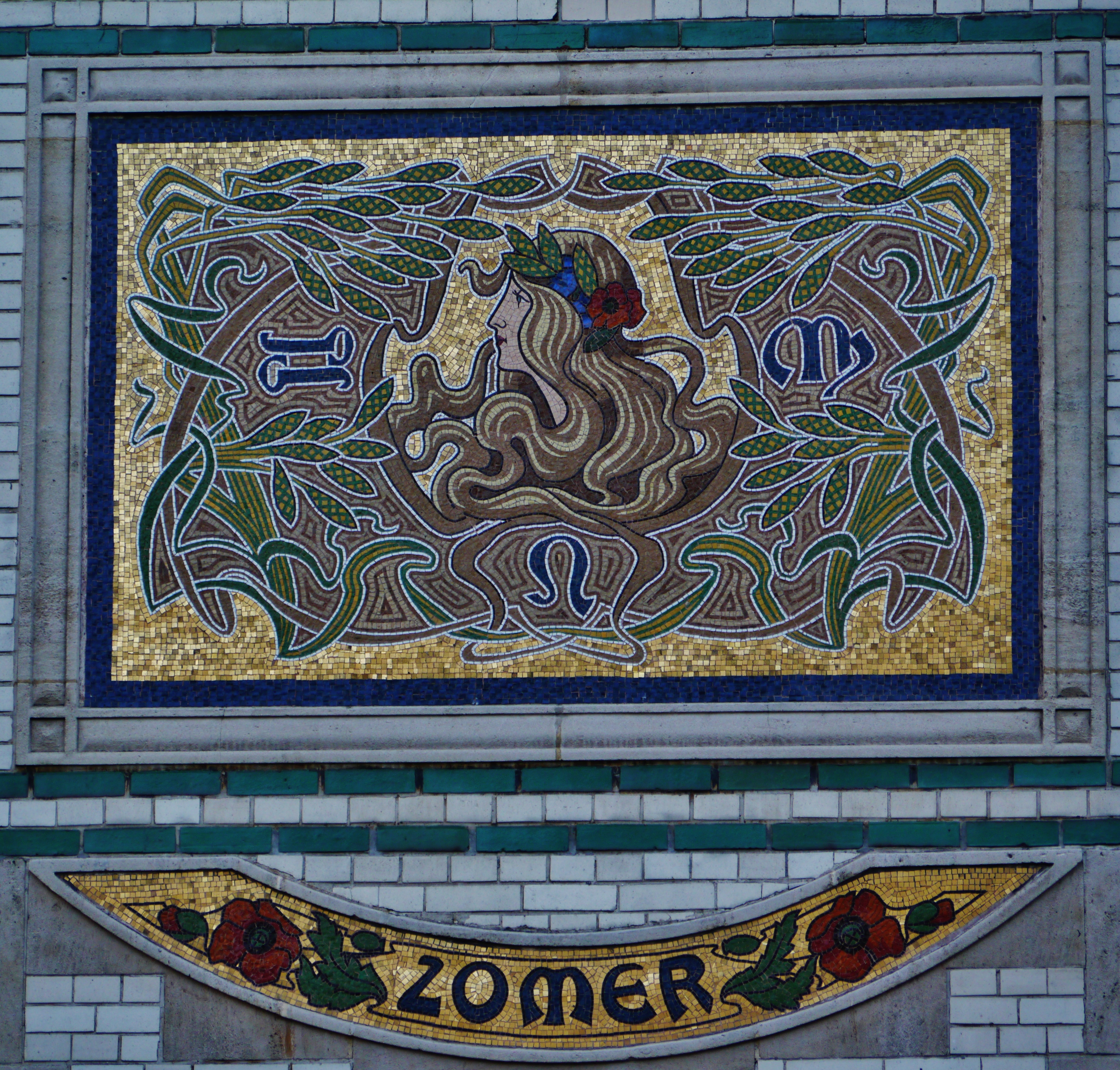
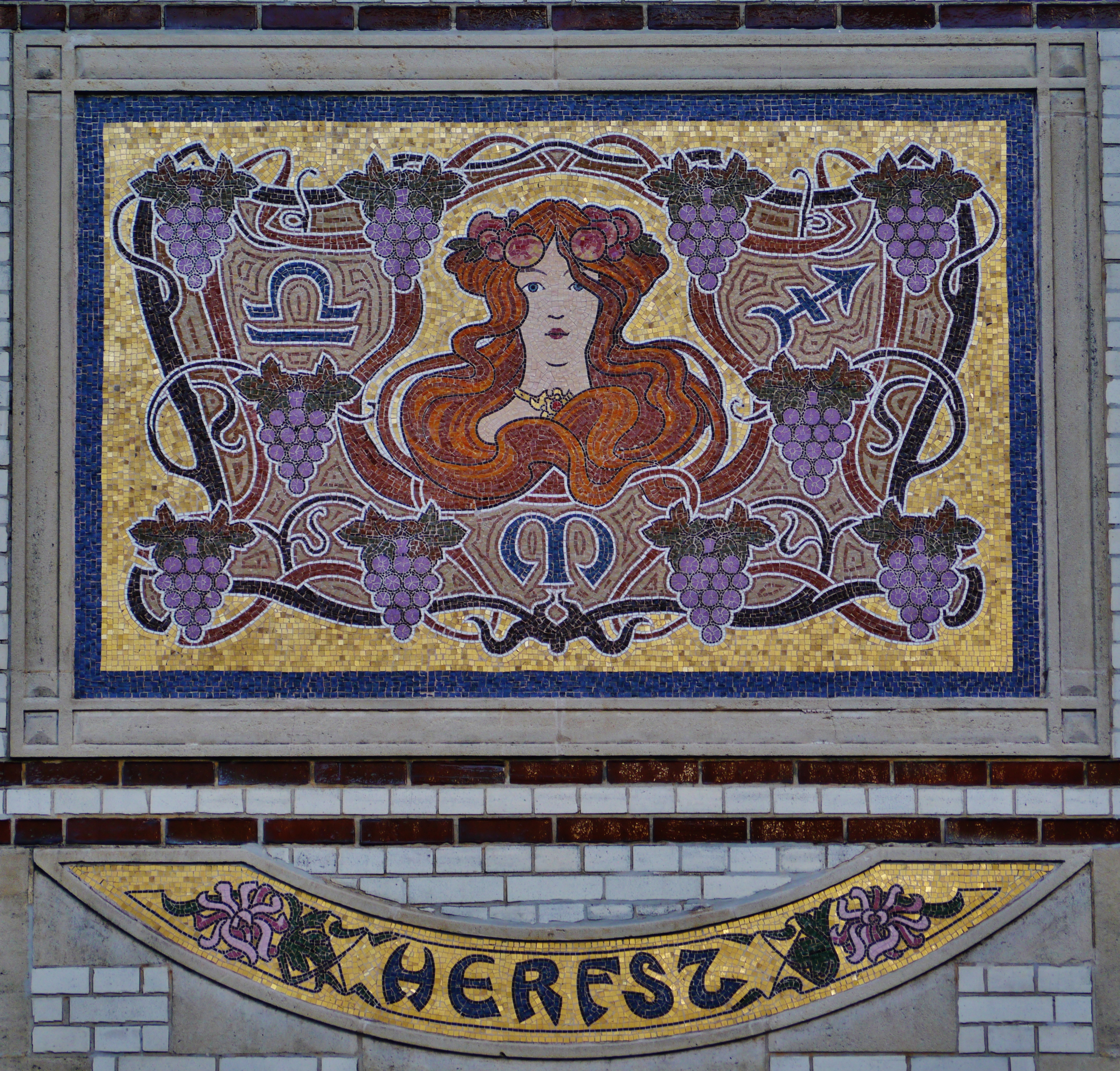
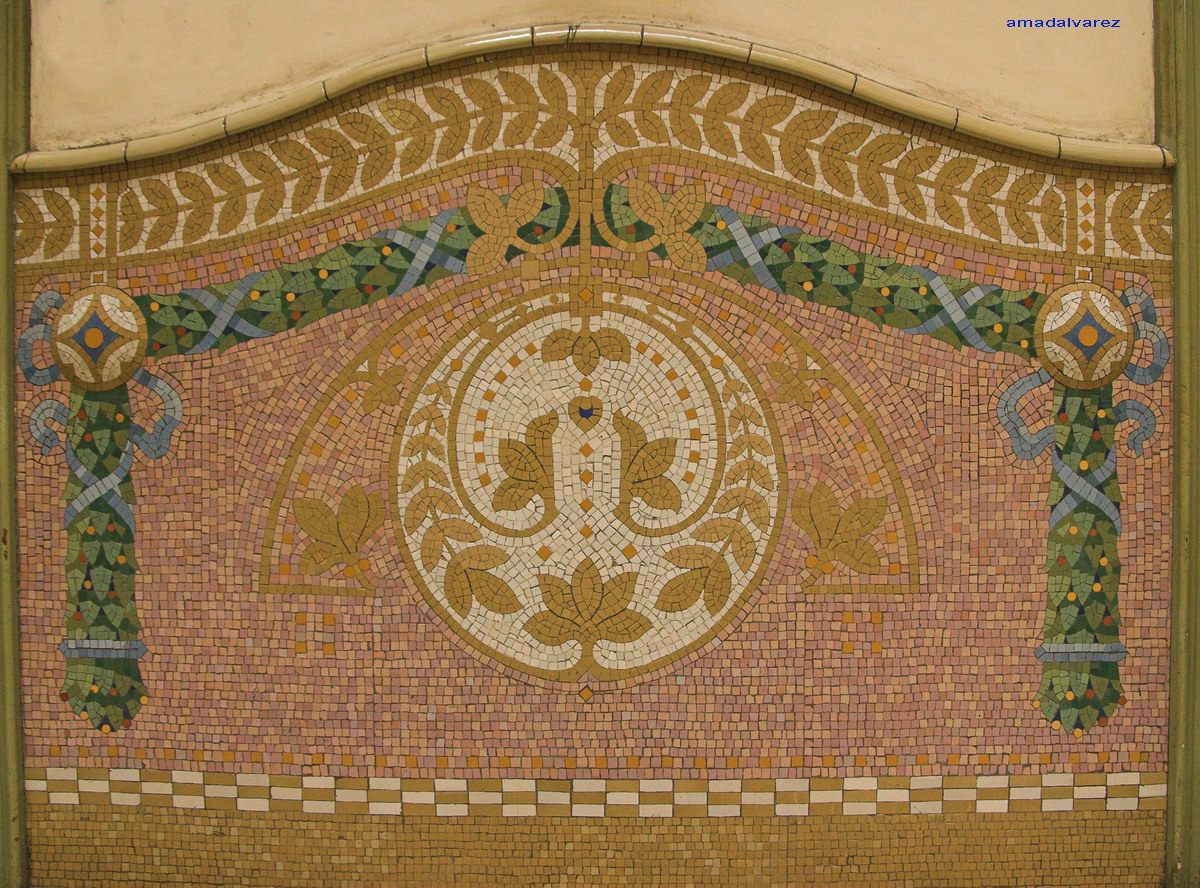
Various examples of mosaics. Each row of 3 pictures represents a style: Ancient Greek or Roman, Byzantine and Art Nouveau.

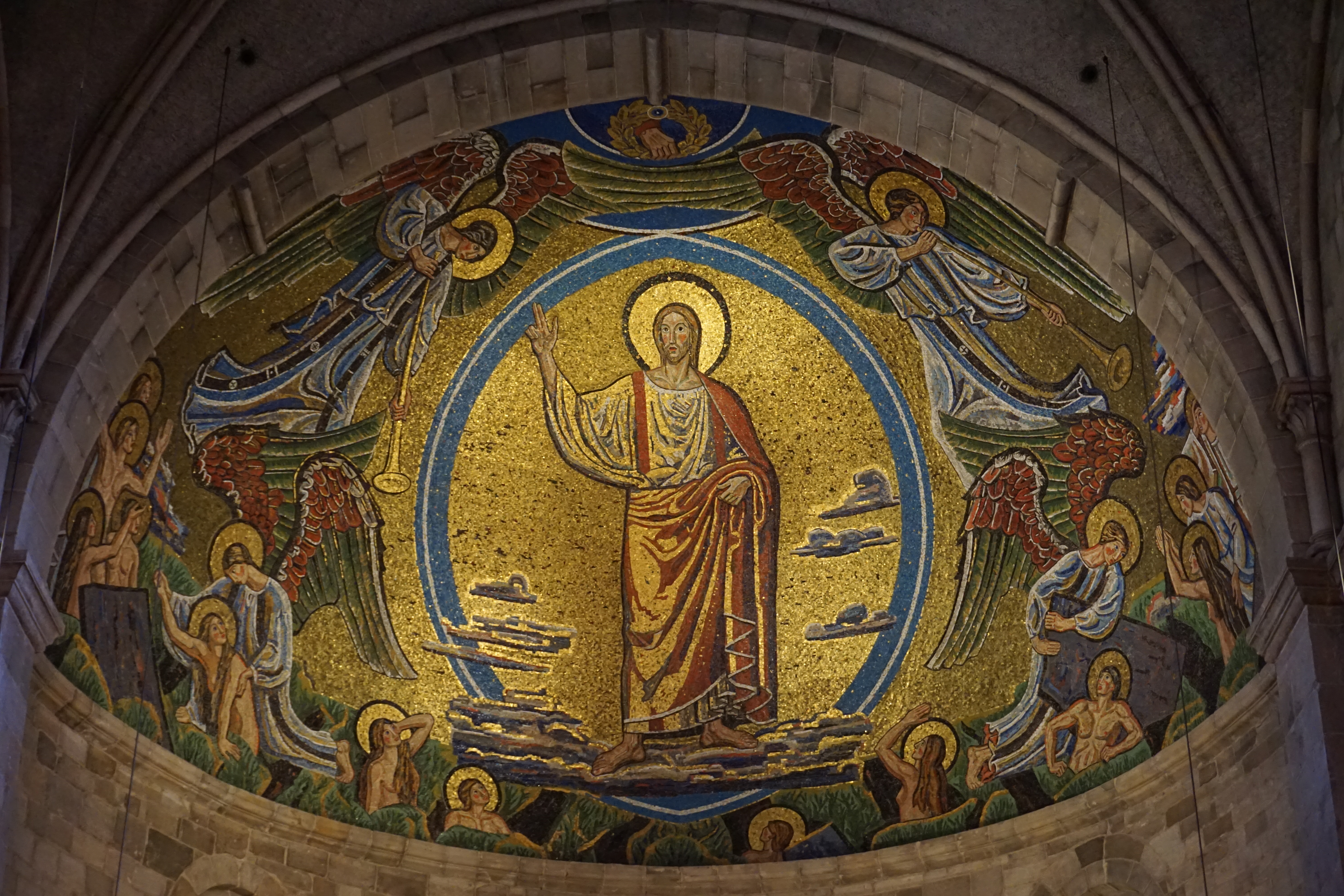
A mosaic depicting Jesus in the apse of Lund Cathedral (Evangelical-Lutheran) in Skåne

A mosaic (/moʊ.ˈzeɪ.ɪk/) is a pattern or image made of small regular or irregular pieces of colored stone, glass or ceramic, held in place by plaster/mortar, and covering a surface. Mosaics are often used as floor and wall decoration, and were particularly popular in the Ancient Roman world.

Mosaic today includes murals and pavements, but also artwork, hobby crafts, industrial and construction forms.

Mosaics have a long history, starting in Mesopotamia in the 3rd millennium BC. Pebble mosaics were made in Tiryns in Mycenean Greece; mosaics with patterns and pictures became widespread in classical times, both in Ancient Greece and Ancient Rome. Early Christian basilicas from the 4th century onwards were decorated with wall and ceiling mosaics. Mosaic art flourished in the Byzantine Empire from the 6th to the 15th centuries; that tradition was adopted by the Norman Kingdom of Sicily in the 12th century, by the eastern-influenced Republic of Venice, and among the Rus. Mosaic fell out of fashion in the Renaissance, though artists like Raphael continued to practice the old technique. Roman and Byzantine influence led Jewish artists to decorate 5th and 6th century synagogues in the Middle East with floor mosaics.

Figurative mosaic, but mostly without human figures, was widely used on religious buildings and palaces in early Islamic art, including Islam's first great religious building, the Dome of the Rock in Jerusalem, and the Umayyad Mosque in Damascus. Such mosaics went out of fashion in the Islamic world after the 8th century, except for geometrical patterns in techniques such as zellij, which remain popular in many areas.

Modern mosaics are made by artists and craftspeople around the world. Many materials other than traditional stone, ceramic tesserae, enameled and stained glass may be employed, including shells, beads, charms, chains, gears, coins, and pieces of costume jewelry.

== Mosaic materials ==
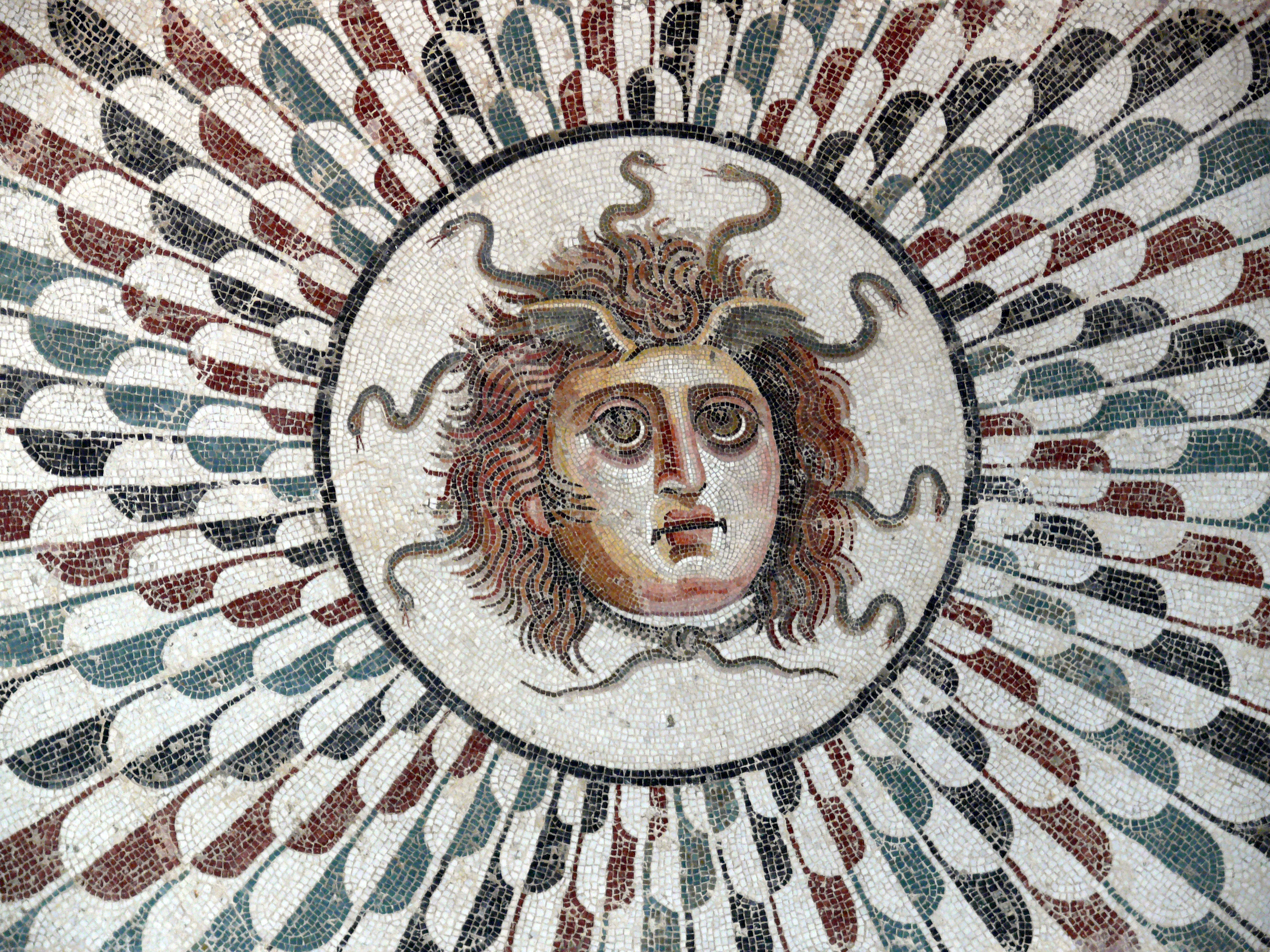
Tepidarium of Dar Zmela house, Sousse Archaeological Museum

Traditional mosaics are made of small cubes of roughly square pieces of stone or hand made glass enamel of different colours, known as tesserae. Some of the earliest mosaics were made of natural pebbles, originally used to reinforce floors.

Mosaic skinning (covering objects with mosaic glass) is done with thin enameled glass and opaque stained glass. Modern mosaic art is made from any material in any size ranging from carved stone, bottle caps, and found objects.

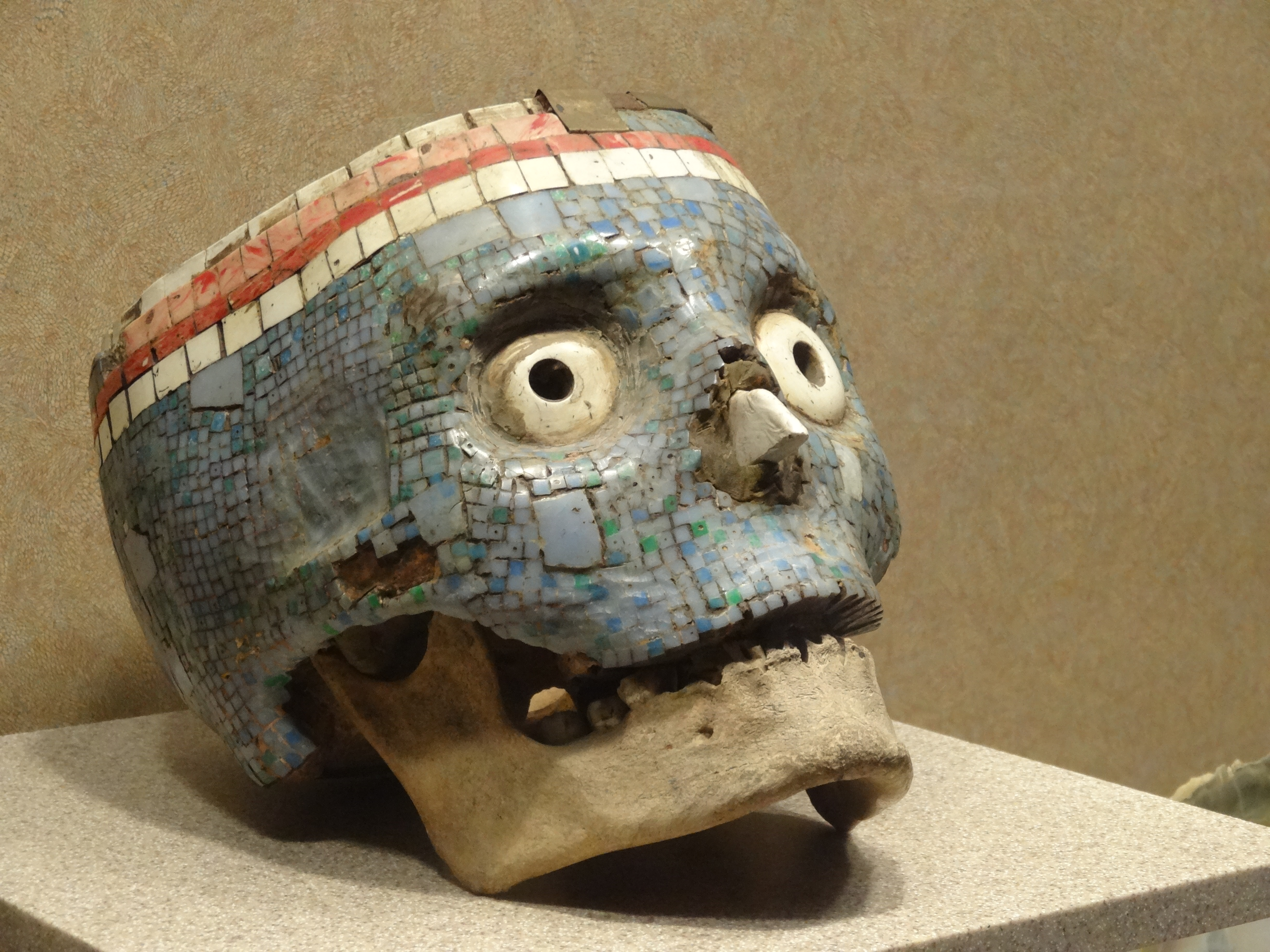
Skull covered with turquoise, Museo Nacional de Antropología (México)

== History ==
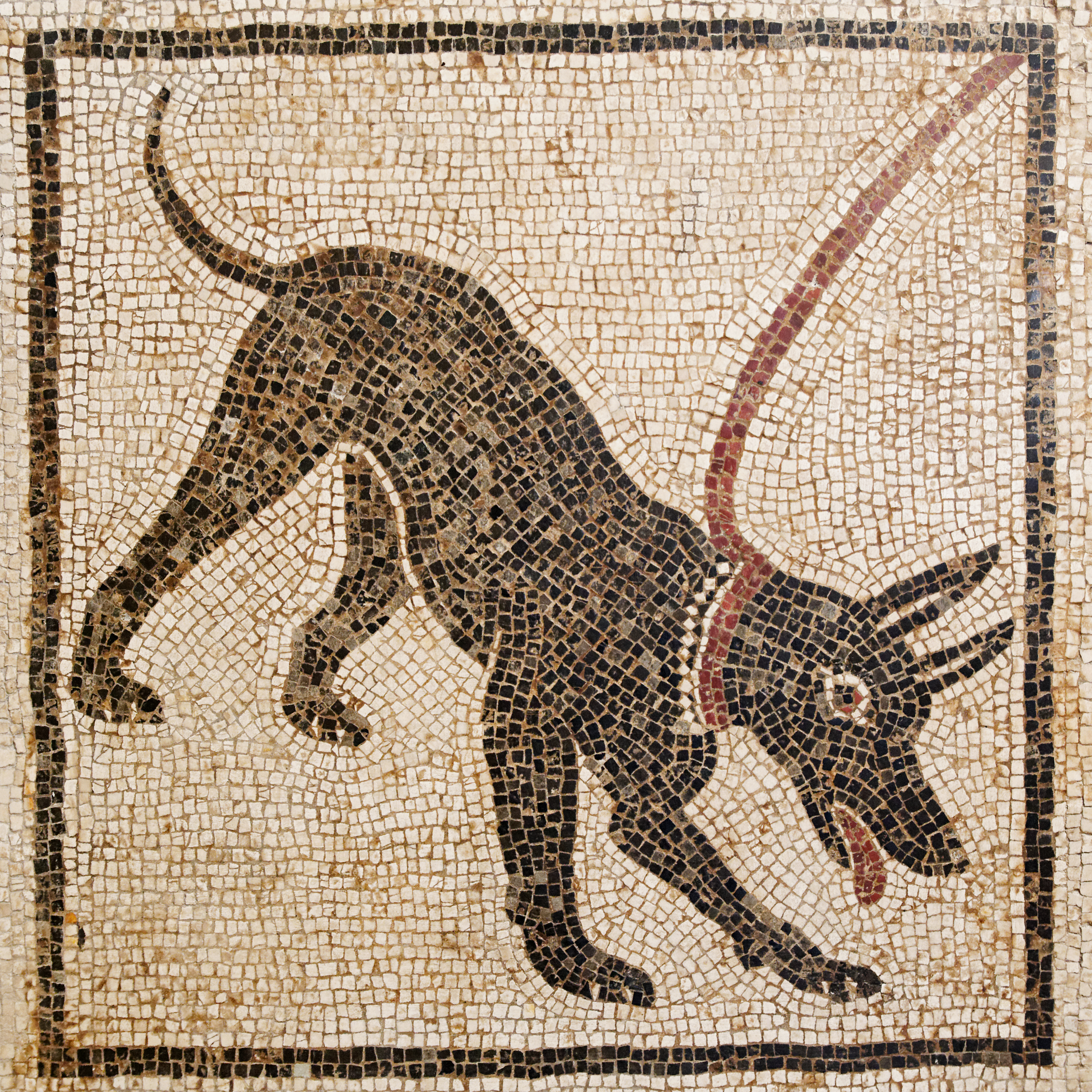
From Pompeii, Casa di Orfeo, National Archaeological Museum, Naples

The earliest known examples of mosaics made of different materials were found at a temple building in Abra, Mesopotamia, and are dated to the second half of 3rd millennium BC. They consist of pieces of colored stones, shells and ivory. Excavations at Susa and Chogha Zanbil show evidence of the first glazed tiles, dating from around 1500 BC. However, mosaic patterns were not used until the times of Sassanid Empire and Roman influence.

=== Greek and Roman ===
Bronze Age pebble mosaics have been found at Tiryns; mosaics of the 4th century BC are found in the Macedonian palace-city of Aegae, and the 4th-century BC mosaic of The Beauty of Durrës discovered in Durrës, Albania in 1916, is an early figural example; the Greek figural style was mostly formed in the 3rd century BC. Mythological subjects, or scenes of hunting or other pursuits of the wealthy, were popular as the centrepieces of a larger geometric design, with strongly emphasized borders. Pliny the Elder mentions the artist Sosus of Pergamon by name, describing his mosaics of the food left on a floor after a feast and of a group of doves drinking from a bowl. Both of these themes were widely copied.

Greek figural mosaics could have been copied or adapted paintings, a far more prestigious artform, and the style was enthusiastically adopted by the Romans so that large floor mosaics enriched the floors of Hellenistic villas and Roman dwellings from Britain to Dura-Europos.

Most recorded names of Roman mosaic workers are Greek, suggesting they dominated high quality work across the empire; no doubt most ordinary craftsmen were slaves. Splendid mosaic floors are found in Roman villas across North Africa, in places such as Carthage, and can still be seen in the extensive collection in Bardo Museum in Tunis, Tunisia.

There were two main techniques in Greco-Roman mosaic: opus vermiculatum used tiny tesserae, typically cubes of 4 millimeters or less, and was produced in workshops in relatively small panels which were transported to the site glued to some temporary support. The tiny tesserae allowed very fine detail, and an approach to the illusionism of painting. Often small panels called emblemata were inserted into walls or as the highlights of larger floor-mosaics in coarser work. The normal technique was opus tessellatum, using larger tesserae, which was laid on site. There was a distinct native Italian style using black on a white background, which was no doubt cheaper than fully coloured work.

In Rome, Nero and his architects used mosaics to cover some surfaces of walls and ceilings in the Domus Aurea, built 64 AD, and wall mosaics are also found at Pompeii and neighbouring sites. However it seems that it was not until the Christian era that figural wall mosaics became a major form of artistic expression. The Roman church of Santa Costanza, which served as a mausoleum for one or more of the Imperial family, has both religious mosaic and decorative secular ceiling mosaics on a round vault, which probably represent the style of contemporary palace decoration.

The mosaics of the Villa Romana del Casale near Piazza Armerina in Sicily are the largest collection of late Roman mosaics in situ in the world, and are protected as a UNESCO World Heritage Site. The large villa rustica, which was probably owned by Emperor Maximian, was built largely in the early 4th century. The mosaics were covered and protected for 700 years by a landslide that occurred in the 12th Century. The most important pieces are the Circus Scene, the 64m long Great Hunting Scene, the Little Hunt, the Labours of Hercules and the famous Bikini Girls, showing women undertaking a range of sporting activities in garments that resemble 20th century bikinis. The peristyle, the imperial apartments and the thermae were also decorated with ornamental and mythological mosaics. Other important examples of Roman mosaic art in Sicily were unearthed on the Piazza Vittoria in Palermo where two houses were discovered. The most important scenes there depicted are an Orpheus mosaic, Alexander the Great's Hunt and the Four Seasons.

In 1913 the Zliten mosaic, a Roman mosaic famous for its many scenes from gladiatorial contests, hunting and everyday life, was discovered in the Libyan town of Zliten. In 2000 archaeologists working in Leptis Magna, Libya, uncovered a 30 ft length of five colorful mosaics created during the 1st or 2nd century AD. The mosaics show a warrior in combat with a deer, four young men wrestling a wild bull to the ground, and a gladiator resting in a state of fatigue, staring at his slain opponent. The mosaics decorated the walls of a cold plunge pool in a bath house within a Roman villa. The gladiator mosaic is noted by scholars as one of the finest examples of mosaic art ever seen – a "masterpiece comparable in quality with the Alexander Mosaic in Pompeii".

A specific genre of Roman mosaic was called asaroton (Greek for "unswept floor"). It depicted in trompe-l'œil style the feast leftovers on the floors of wealthy houses.

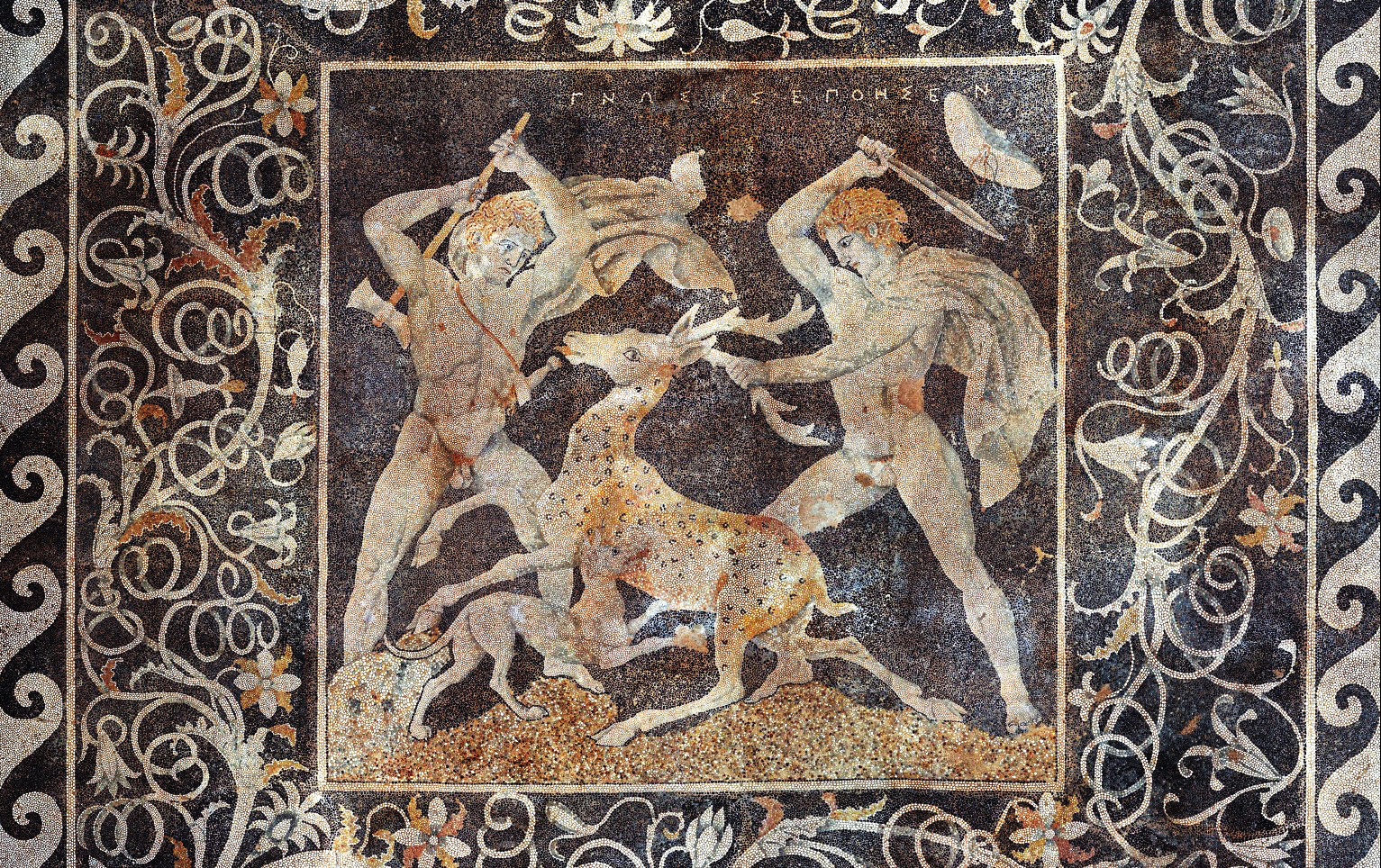
Stag Hunt Mosaic from the House of the Abduction of Helen at Pella, ancient Macedonia, late 4th century BC

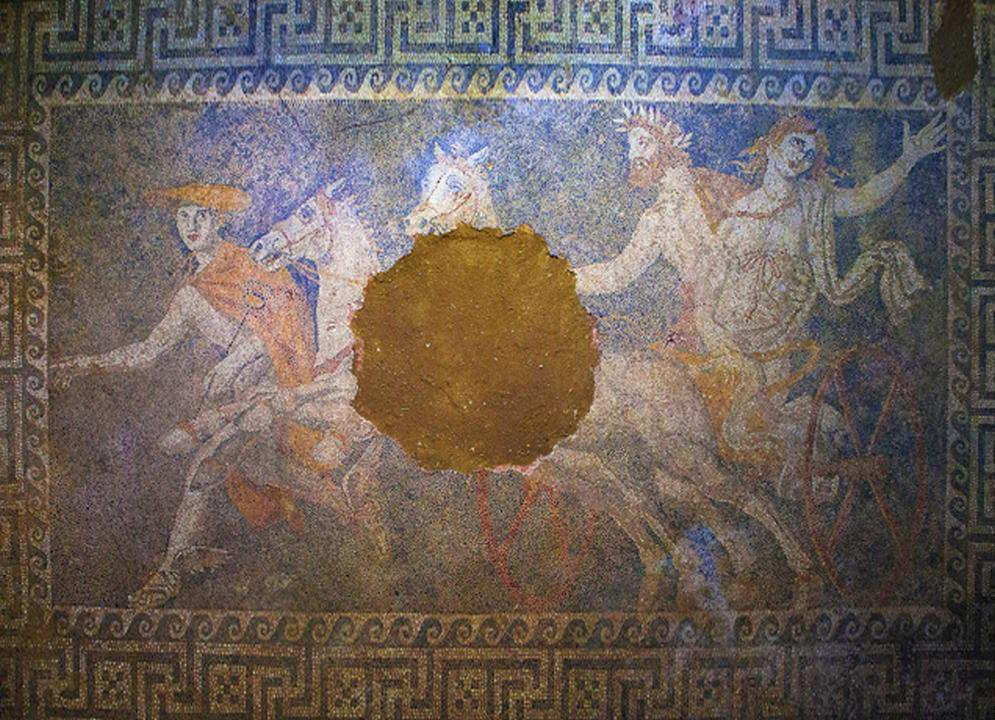
A mosaic of the Kasta Tomb in Amphipolis depicting the abduction of Persephone by Pluto, 4th century BC

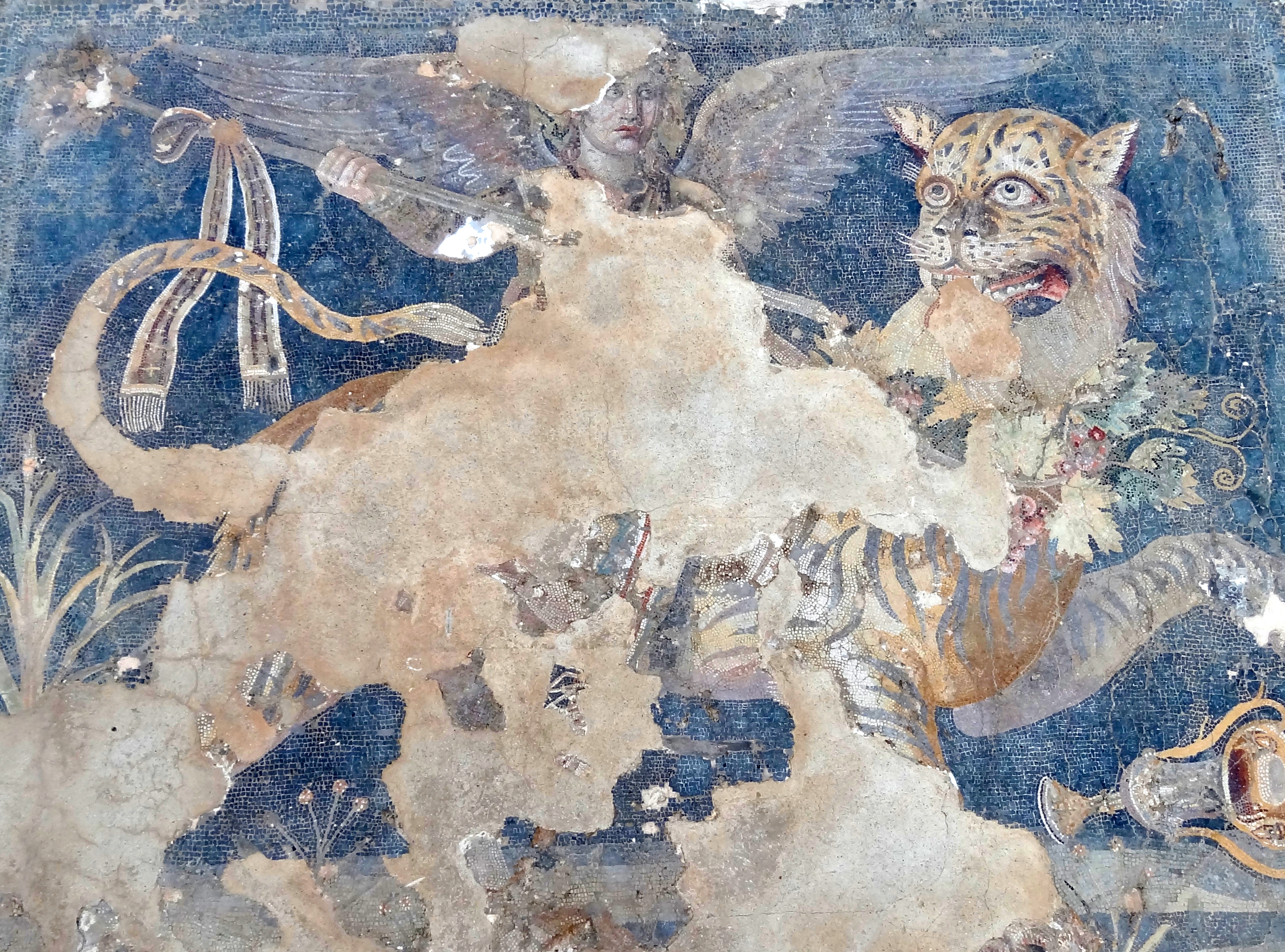
A Hellenistic Greek mosaic depicting the god Dionysos as a winged daimon riding on a tiger, from the House of Dionysos at Delos in the South Aegean region of Greece, late 2nd century BC

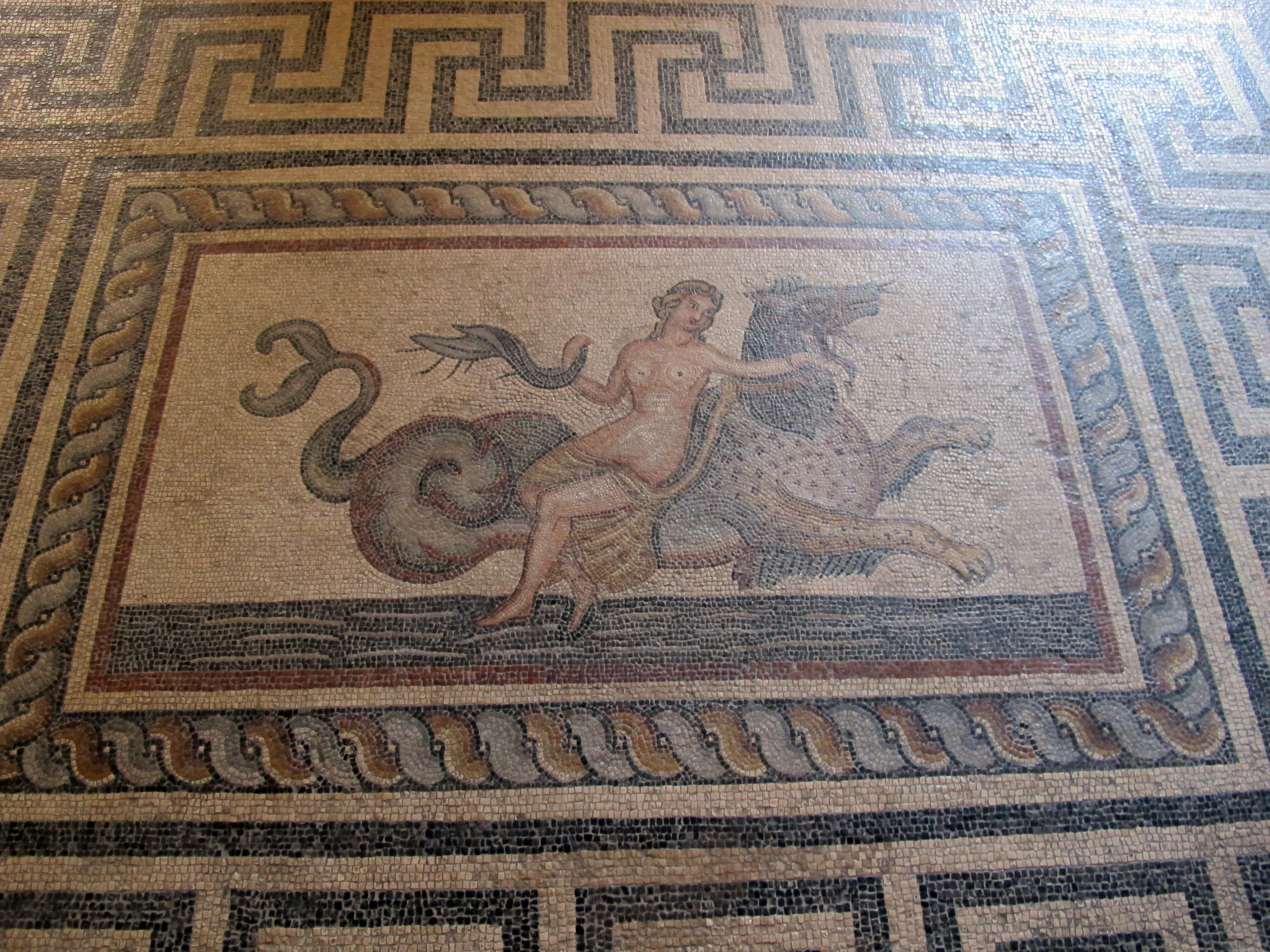
A Hellenistic Greek mosaic of a nymph riding on a marine creature, from the Palace of the Grand Master of the Knights of Rhodes, Greece, 2nd century BC

This centaur mosaic was found on the site of the Roman emperor Hadrian's Villa near Tivoli, Italy. Altes Museum, Berlin.

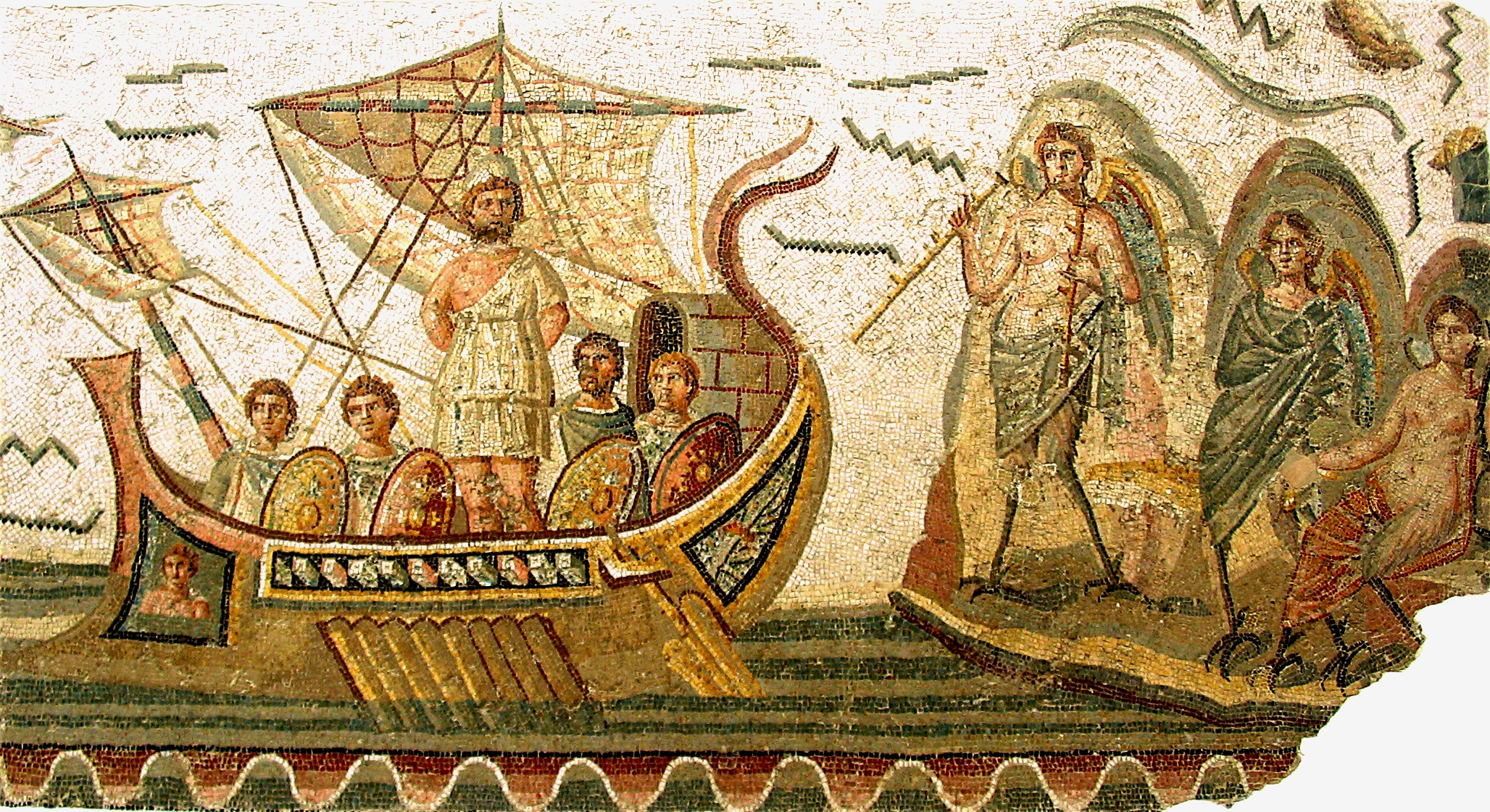
Roman mosaic of Ulysses, from Carthage, 2nd century AD, now in the Bardo Museum, Tunisia

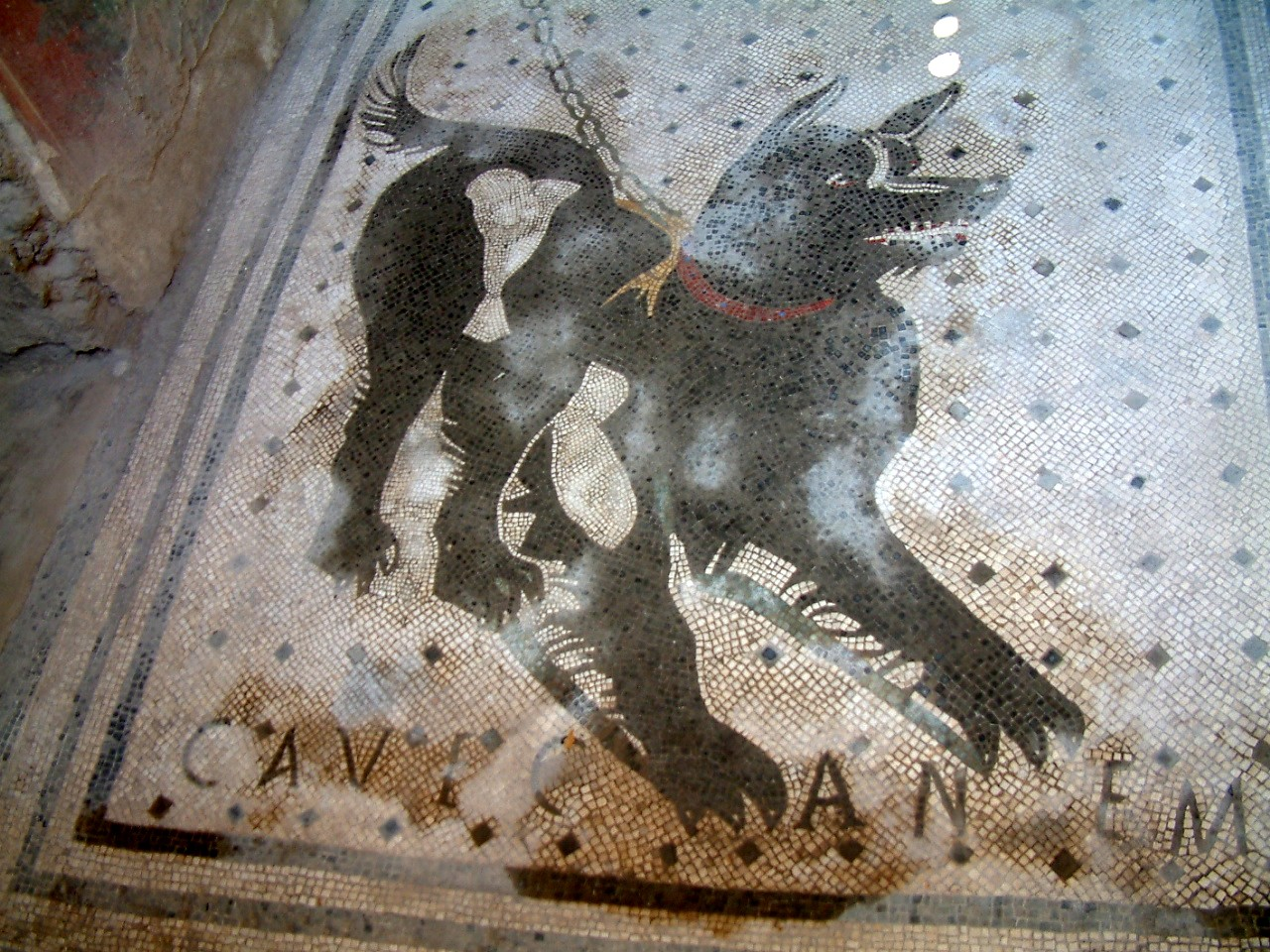
Cave canem mosaics ('Beware of the dog') were a popular motif for the thresholds of Roman villas

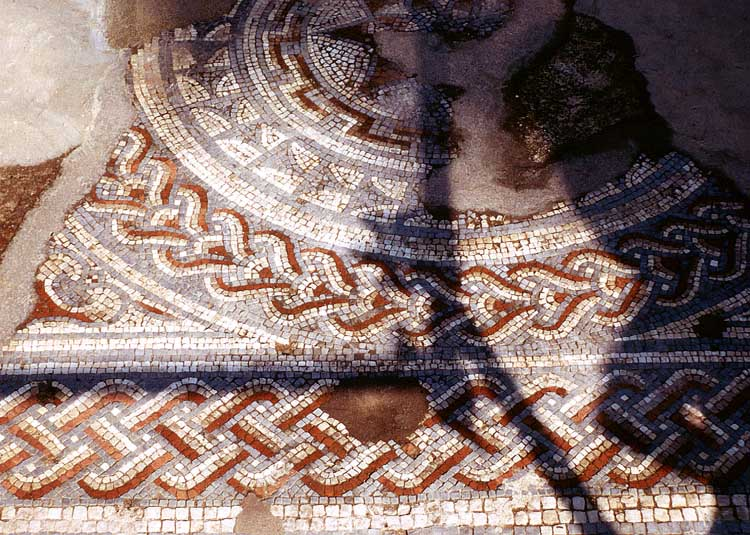
A small part of The Great Pavement, a Roman mosaic laid in AD 325 at Woodchester, Gloucestershire, England

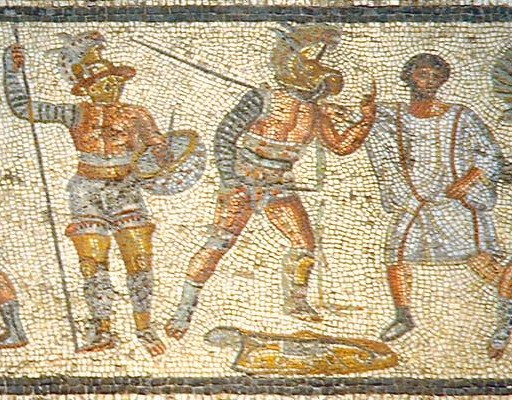
The Zliten mosaic showing gladiators, 2nd century AD

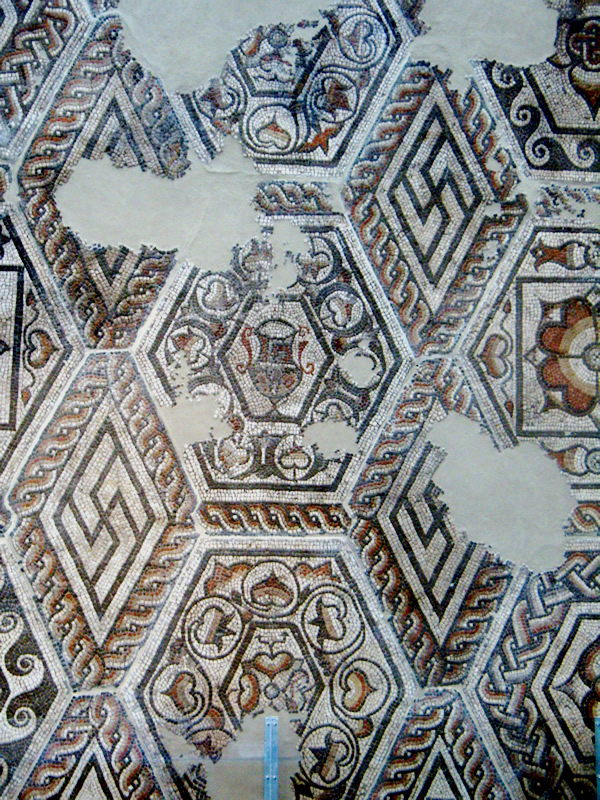
Roman mosaic found at Calleva Atrebatum (Silchester)

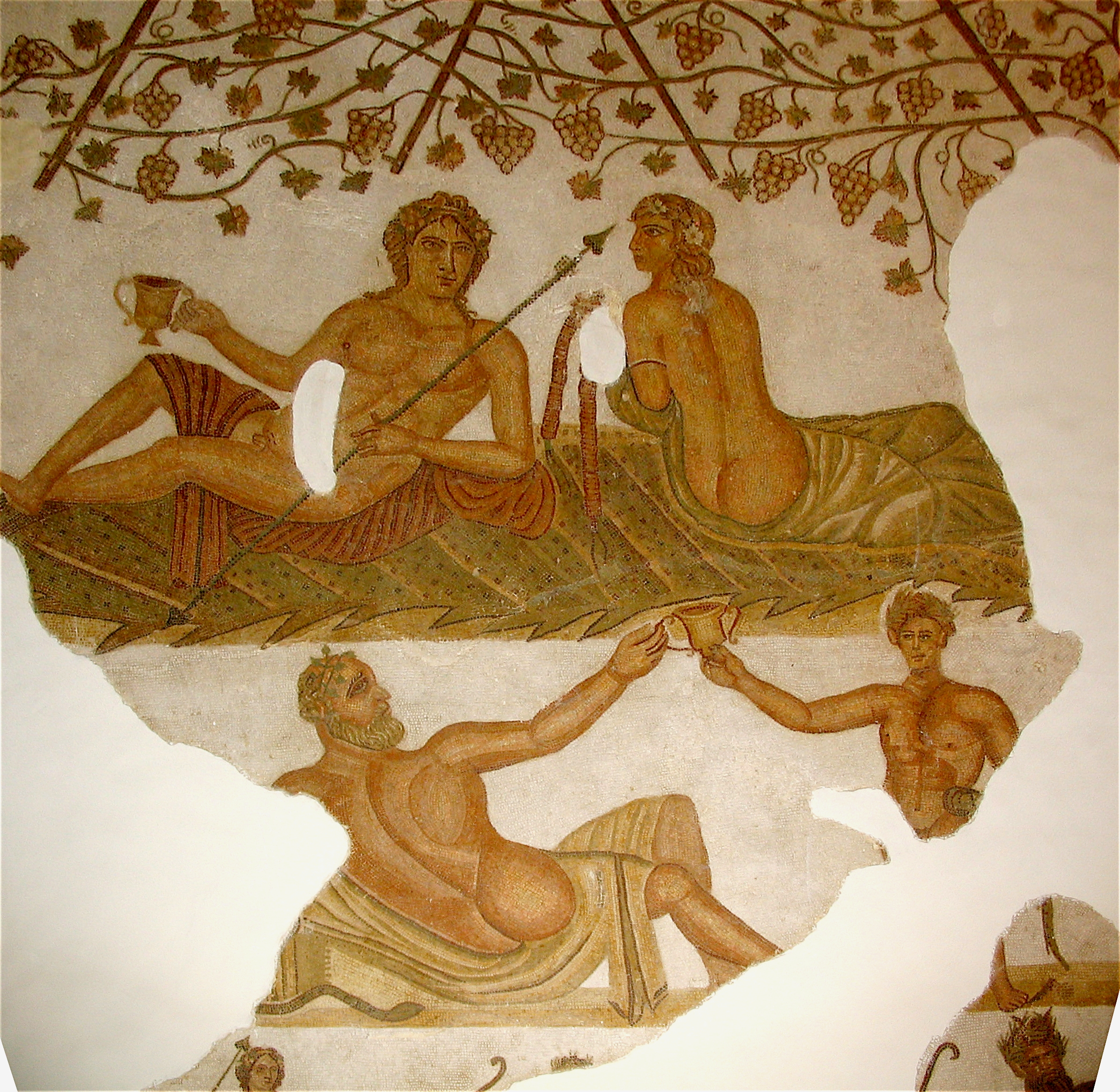
A Roman mosaic depicting the wedding of Dionysos and Ariadne, with Silenus and a satyr, 2nd century AD, Tunis, Tunisia

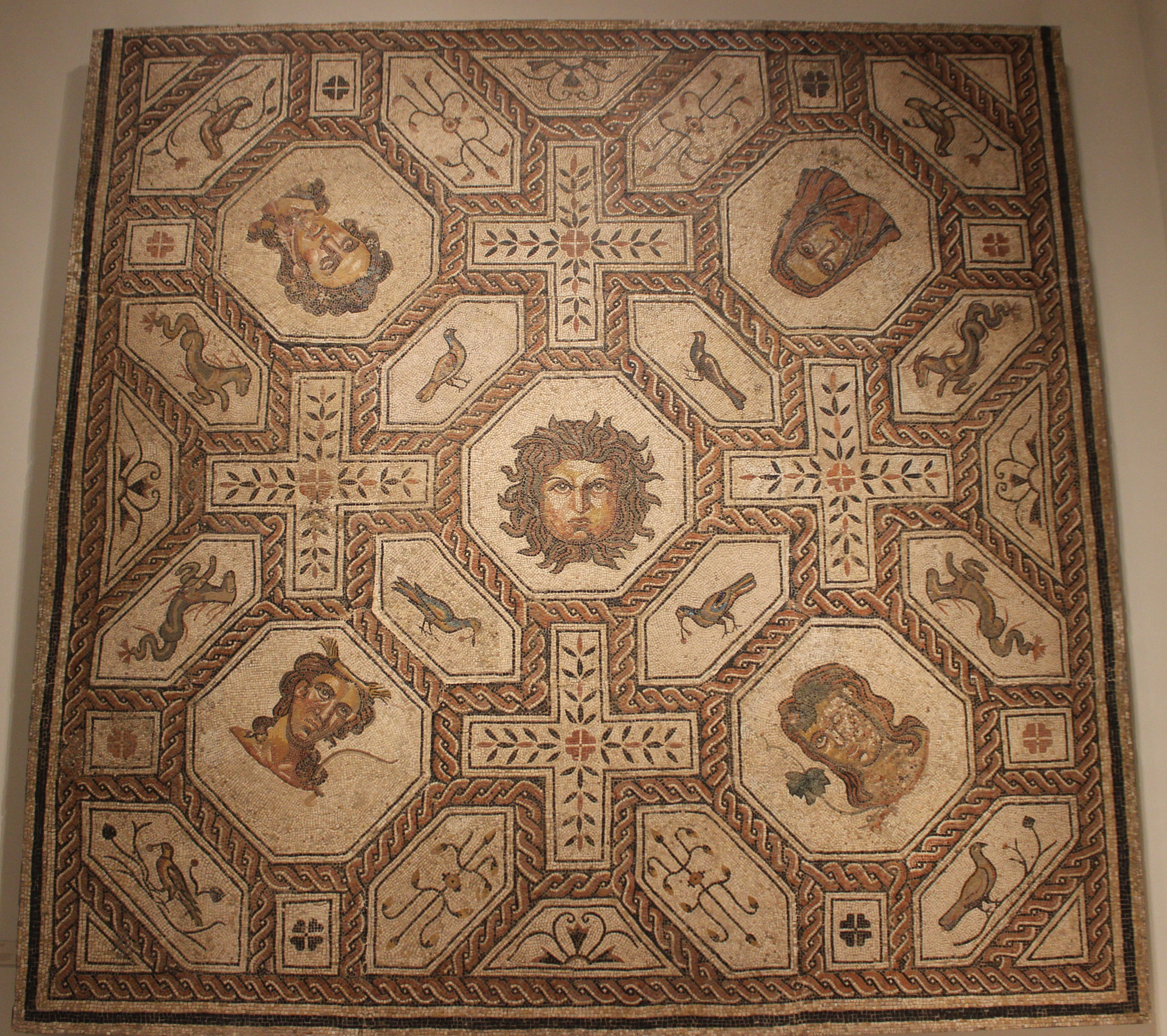
A mosaic showing Medusa and representational figures of the four seasons, from Palencia, Spain, made between 167 and 200 AD

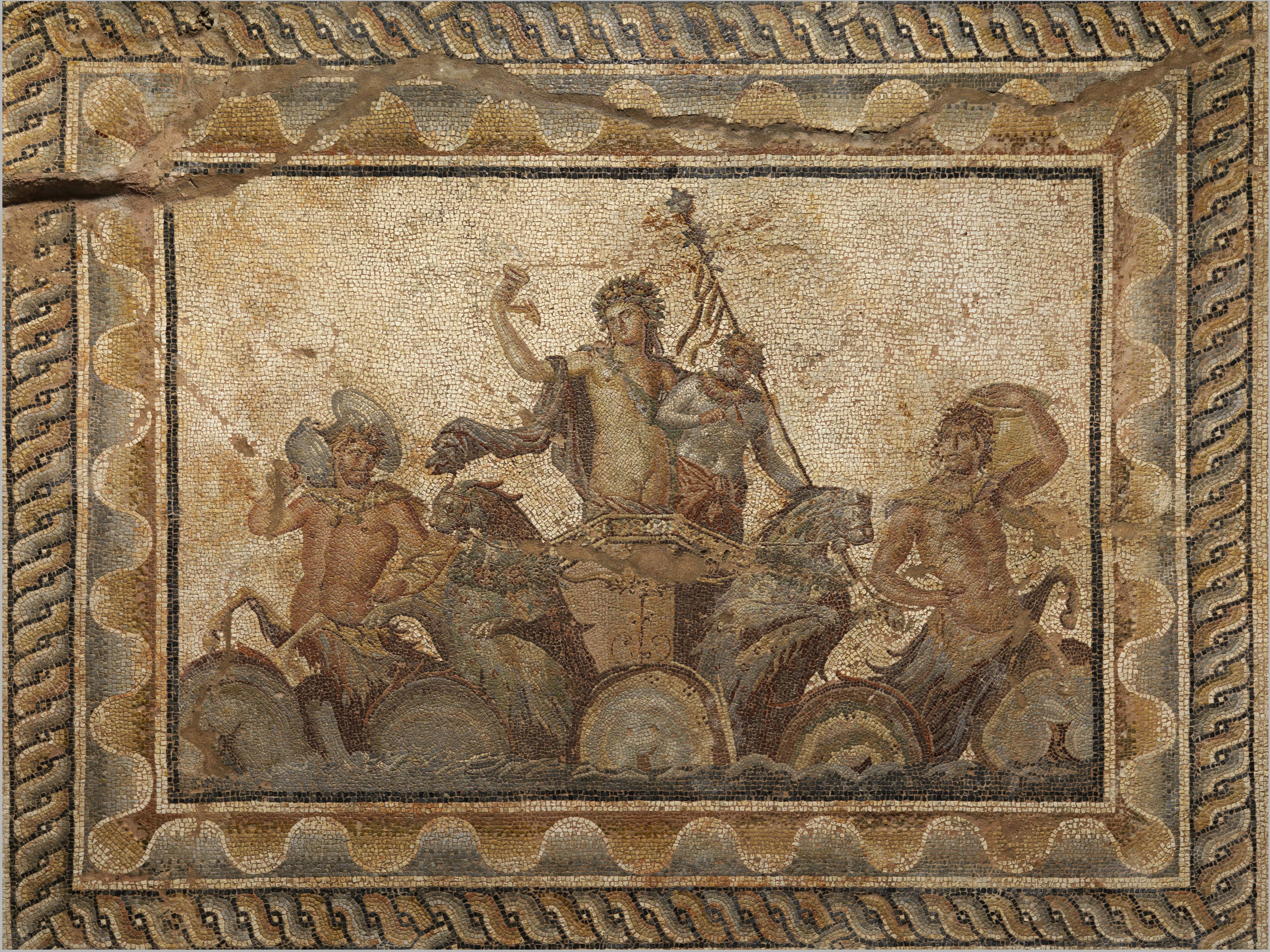
Epiphany of Dionysus mosaic, from the Villa of Dionysus (2nd century AD) in Dion, Greece. Now in the Archeological Museum of Dion.

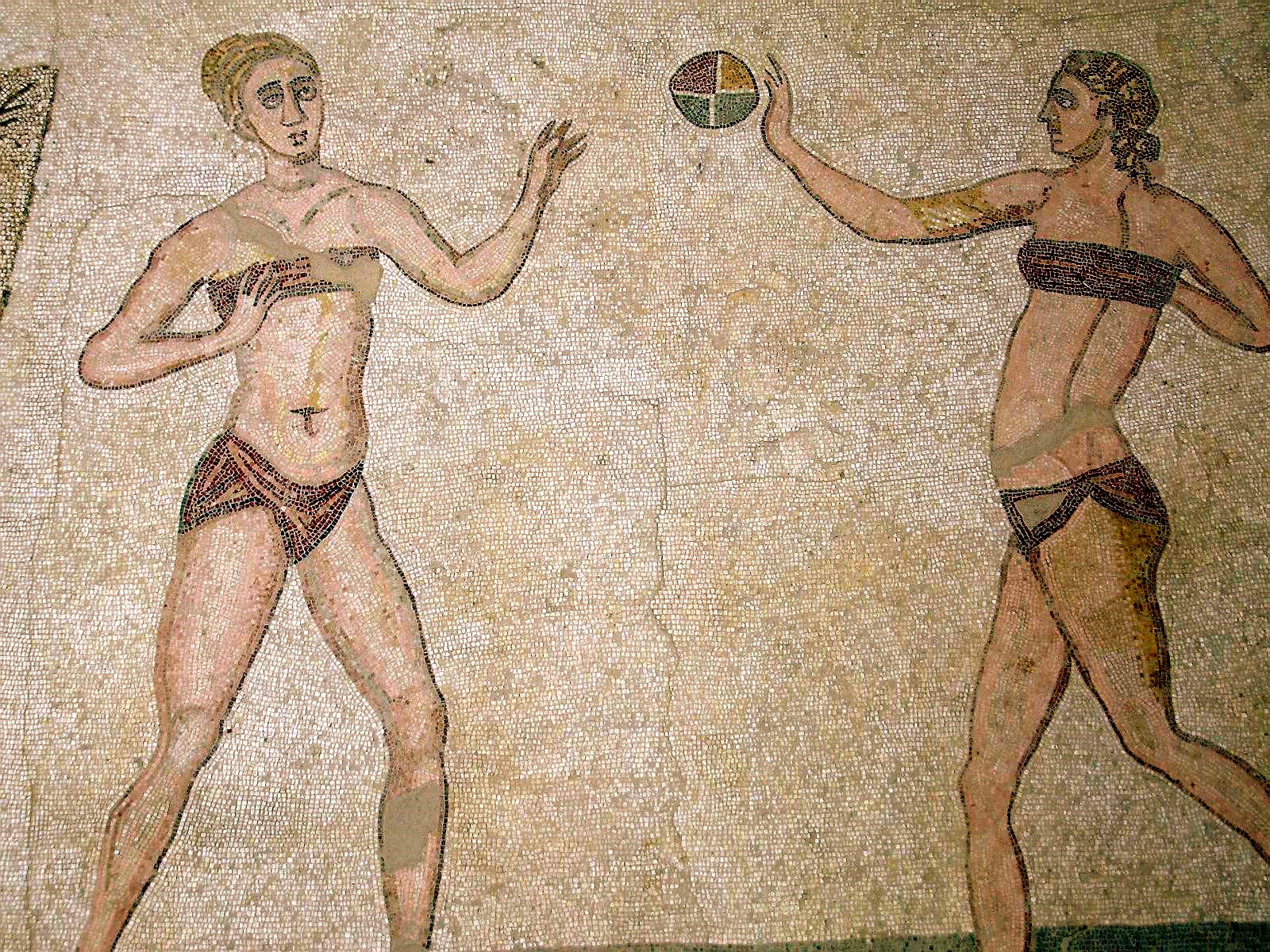
Villa Romana del Casale of Piazza Armerina, 4th century AD

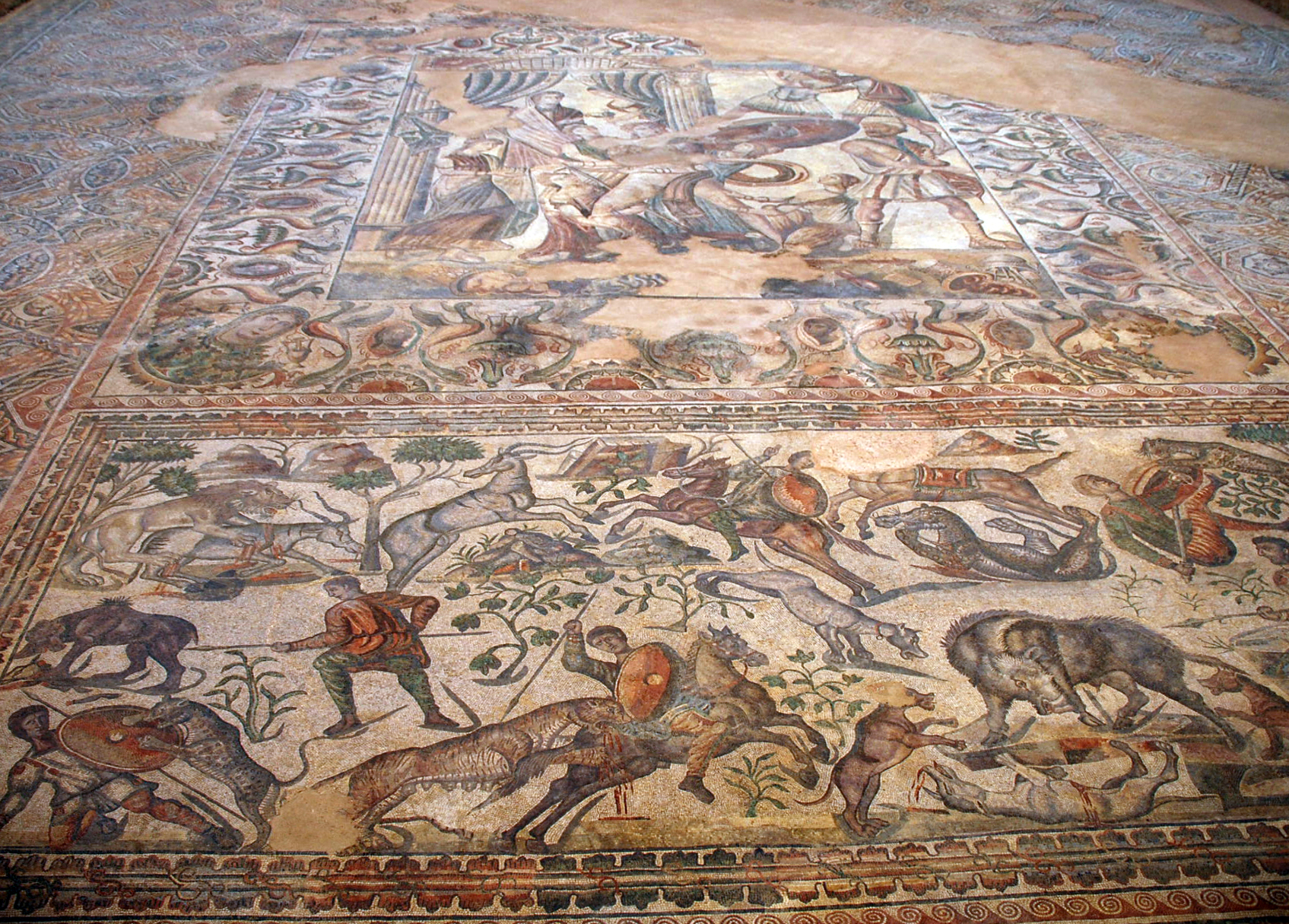
Late Roman mosaics at Villa Romana La Olmeda, Spain, 4th-5th centuries AD

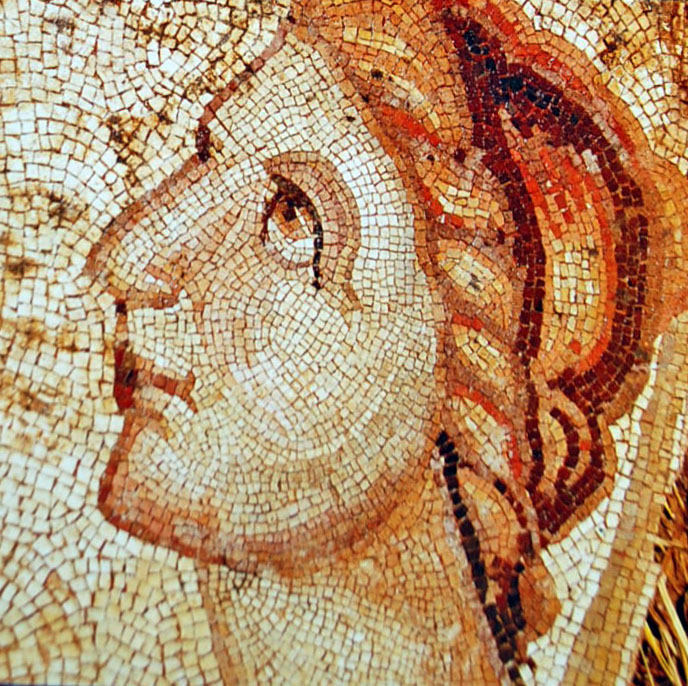
Detail of a princess of Skyros (from a larger scene of the Iliad depicting her and other princesses fawning over Achilles as Odysseus looks on), from the villa of La Olmeda, Spain, 4th-5th centuries AD

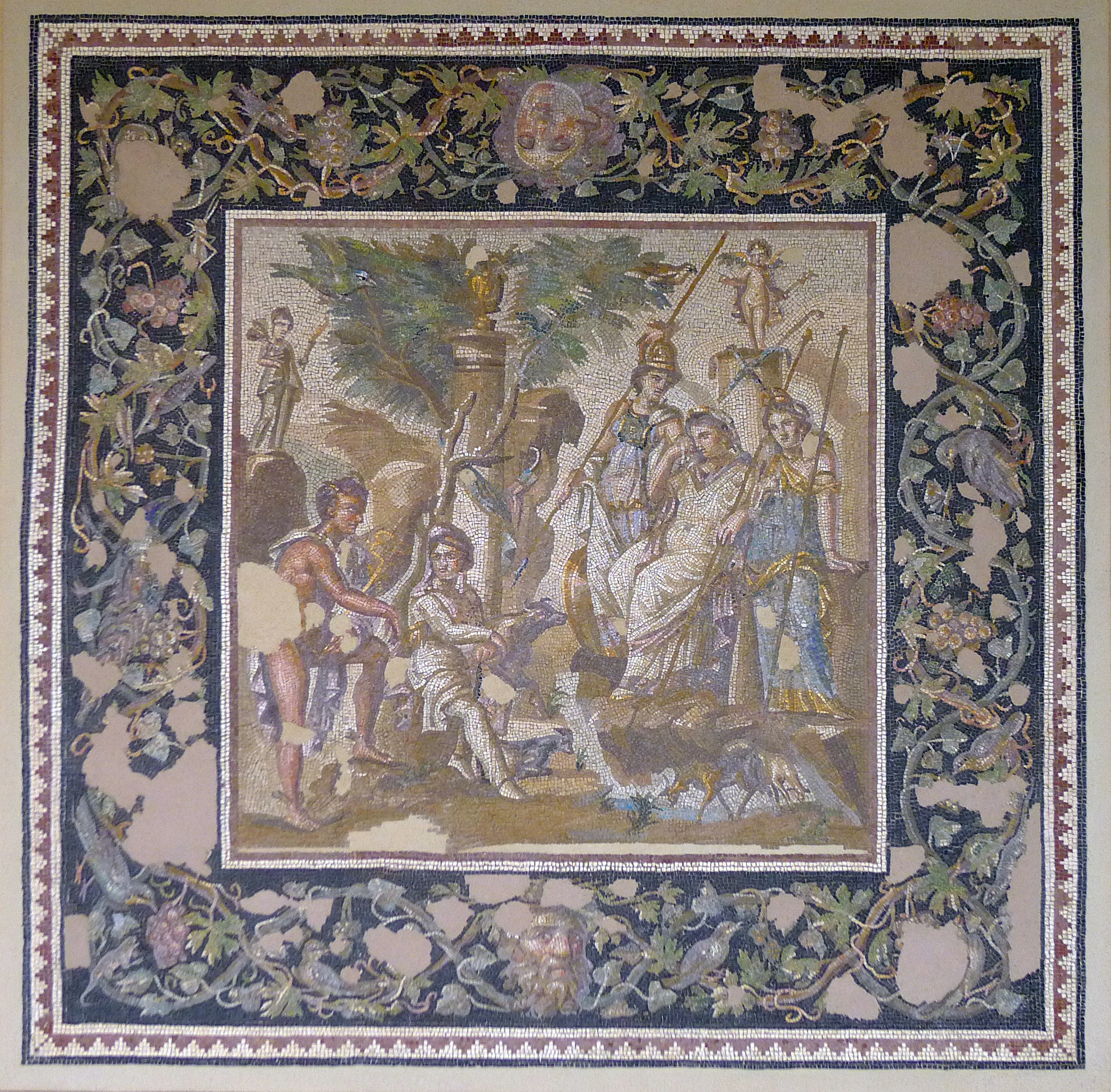
Judgment of Paris, marble, limestone and glass tesserae, 115–150 AD; from the Atrium House triclinium in Antioch-on-the-Orontes

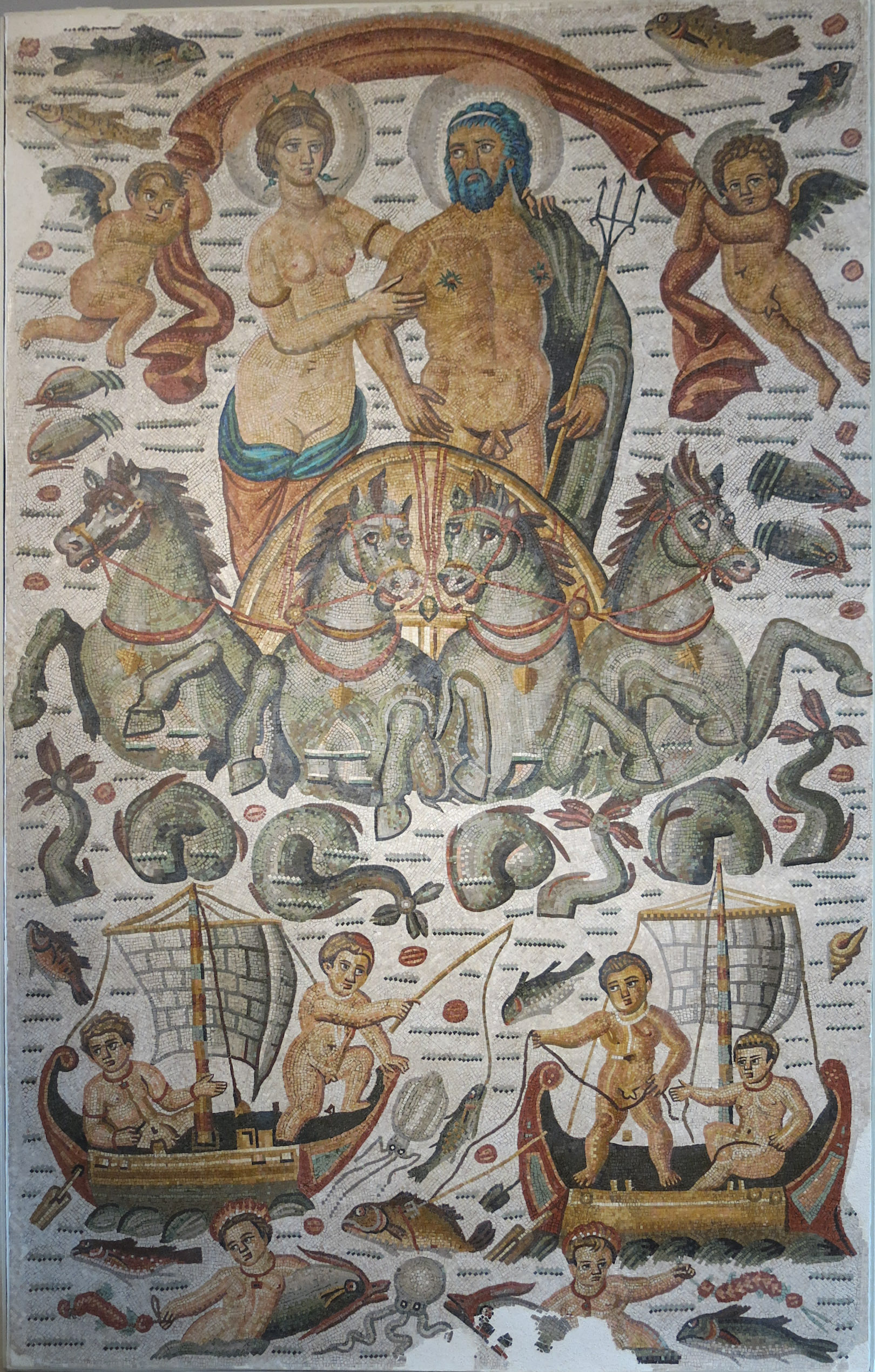
Triumph of Poseidon and Amphitrite showing the couple in procession, detail of a mosaic from Cirta, Roman Africa, 315–325 AD, Louvre

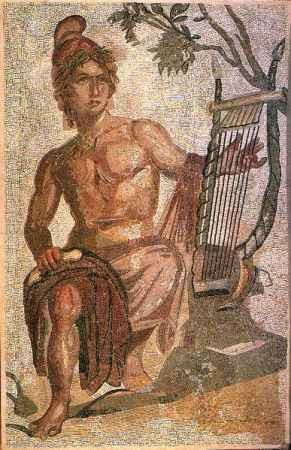
Mosaic of Orpheus from Caralis, modern Cagliari (Italy), now in Archeological Museum of Turin

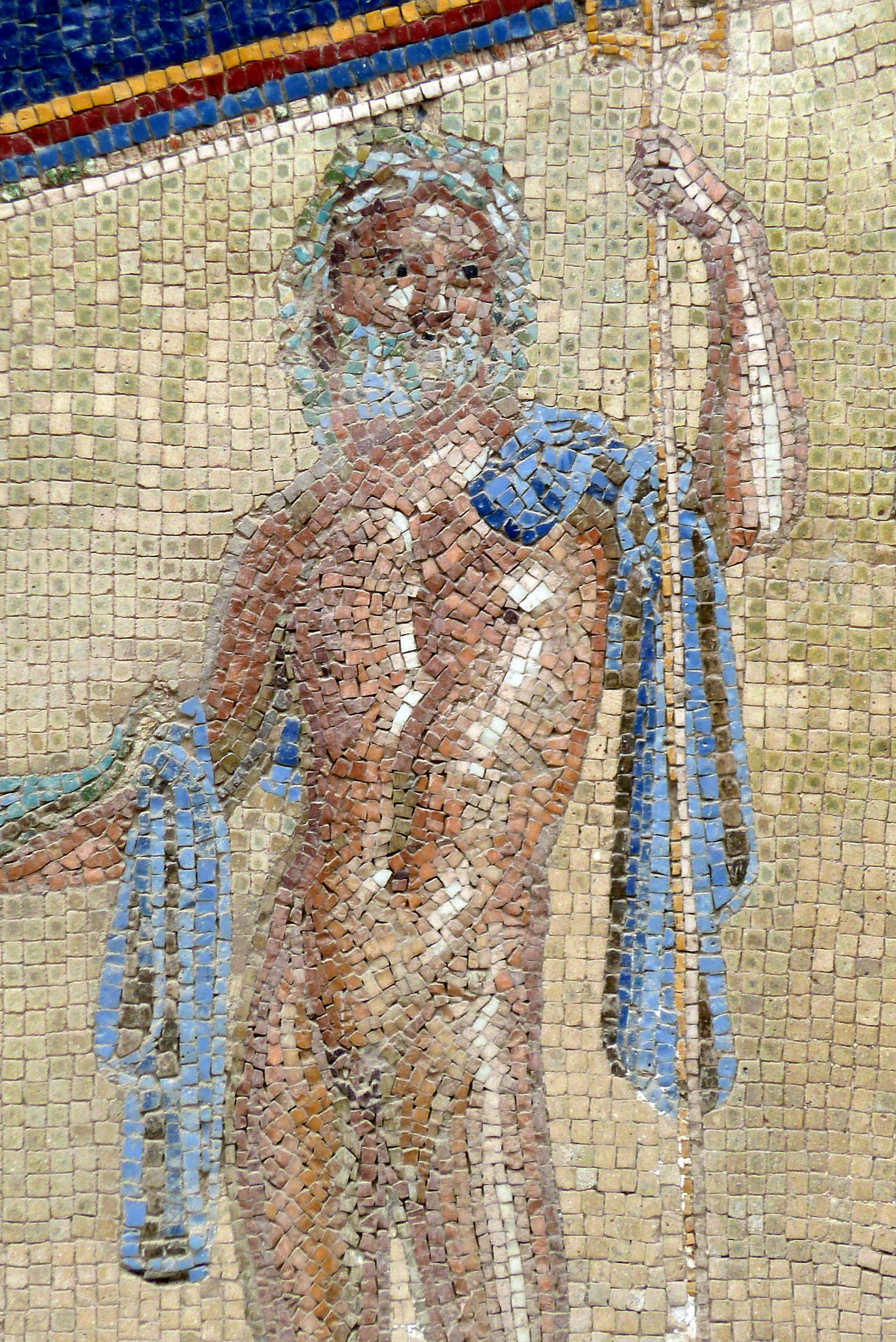
House of the Neptune Mosaic Casa di Nettuno ed Anfitrite (Ins. V) - Triclinium (dining room) decor

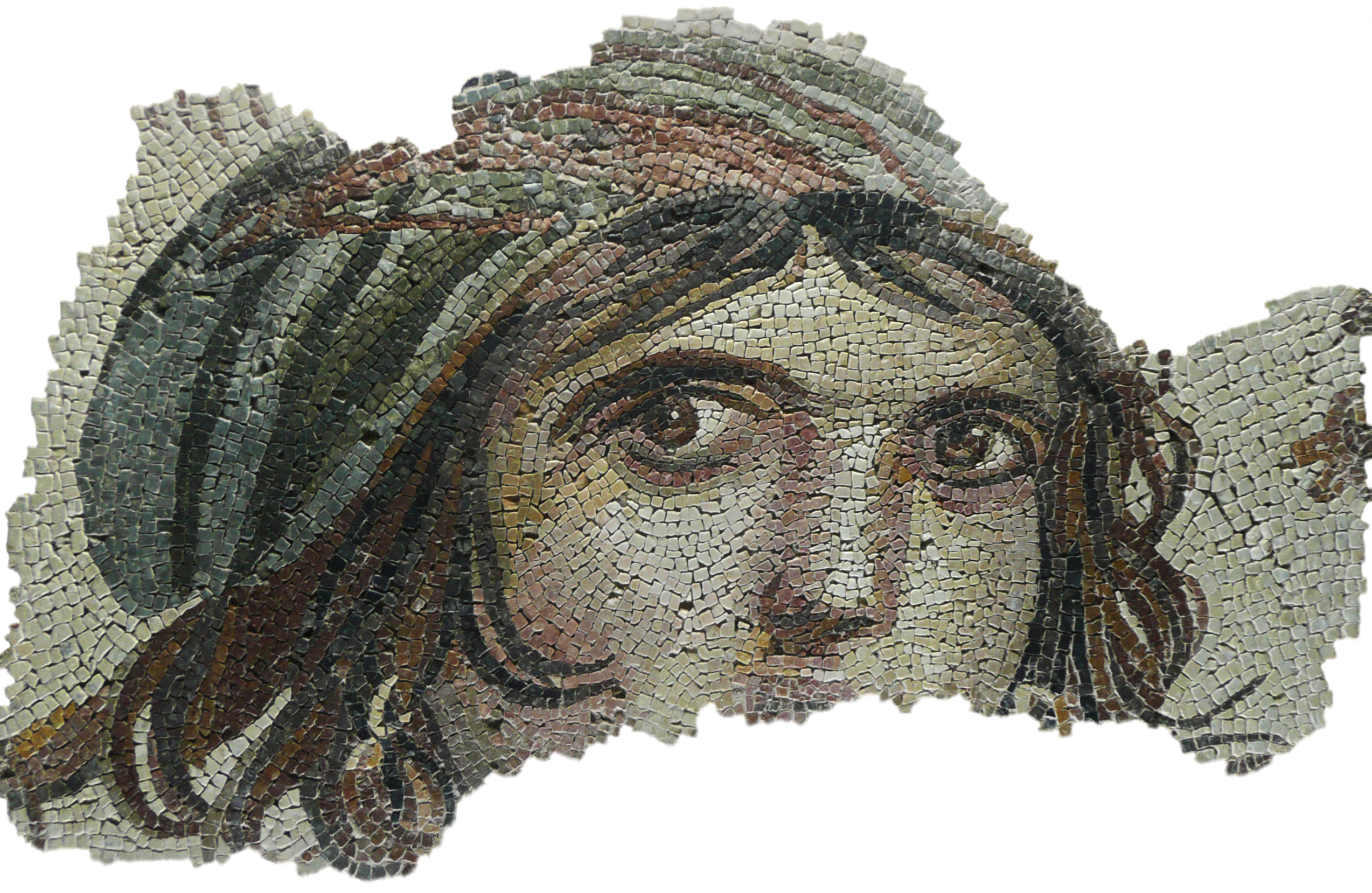
(Gaziantep Museum of Archeology)(Zeugma)

==== Zoroastrian Persia ====
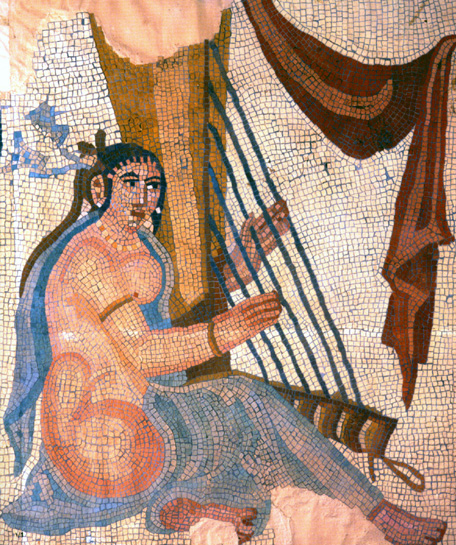
Sasanian-era floor pavement marble mosaic representing female dancers, Shapur palace, Bishapur, Iran, c. 260 AD.

Tilework had been known there for about two thousand years when cultural exchange between Sassanid Empire and Romans influenced Persian artists to create mosaic patterns. Shapur I decorated his palace with tile compositions depicting dancers, musicians, courtesans, etc. This was the only significant example of figurative Persian mosaic, which became prohibited after Arab conquest and arrival of Islam.

=== Christian mosaics ===
==== Early Christian art ====
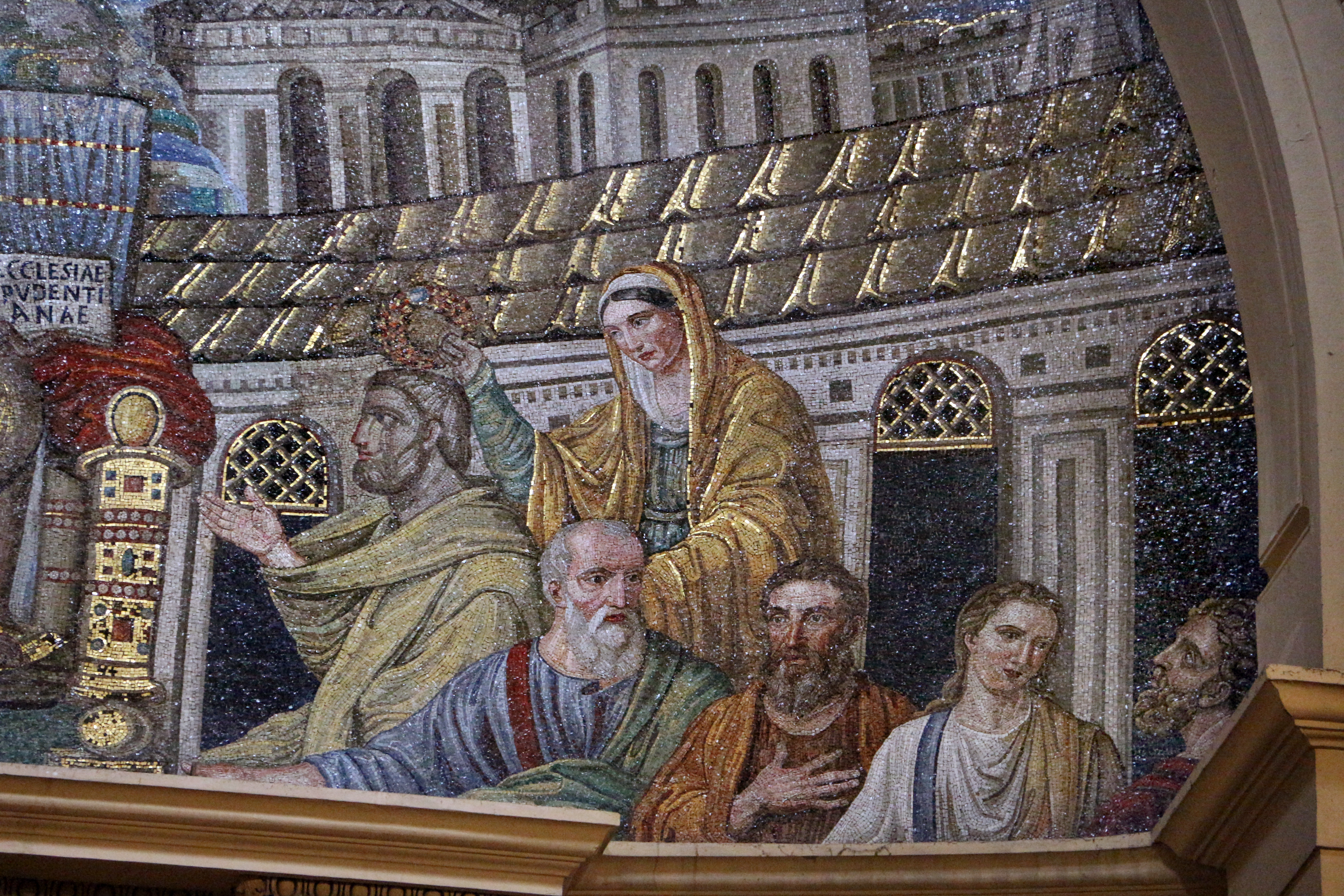
Detail of a Paleochristian mosaic from the basilica of Santa Pudenziana in Rome, c. 410 AD, depicting Saint Pudentiana

With the building of Christian basilicas in the late 4th century, wall and ceiling mosaics were adopted for Christian uses. The earliest examples of Christian basilicas have not survived, but the mosaics of Santa Constanza and Santa Pudenziana, both from the 4th century, still exist. The winemaking putti in the ambulatory of Santa Constanza still follow the classical tradition in that they represent the feast of Bacchus, which symbolizes transformation or change, and are thus appropriate for a mausoleum, the original function of this building. In another great Constantinian basilica, the Church of the Nativity in Bethlehem the original mosaic floor with typical Roman geometric motifs is partially preserved. The so-called Tomb of the Julii, near the crypt beneath St Peter's Basilica, is a 4th-century vaulted tomb with wall and ceiling mosaics that are given Christian interpretations. The Rotunda of Galerius in Thessaloniki, converted into a Christian church during the course of the 4th century, was embellished with very high artistic quality mosaics. Only fragments survive of the original decoration, especially a band depicting saints with hands raised in prayer, in front of complex architectural fantasies.

In the following century Ravenna, the capital of the Western Roman Empire, became the center of late Roman mosaic art (see details in Ravenna section). Milan also served as the capital of the western empire in the 4th century. In the St Aquilinus Chapel of the Basilica of San Lorenzo, mosaics executed in the late 4th and early 5th centuries depict Christ with the Apostles and the Abduction of Elijah; these mosaics are outstanding for their bright colors, naturalism and adherence to the classical canons of order and proportion. The surviving apse mosaic of the Basilica of Sant'Ambrogio, which shows Christ enthroned between Saint Gervasius and Saint Protasius and angels before a golden background date back to the 5th and to the 8th century, although it was restored many times later. The baptistery of the basilica, which was demolished in the 15th century, had a vault covered with gold-leaf tesserae, large quantities of which were found when the site was excavated. In the small shrine of San Vittore in ciel d'oro, now a chapel of Sant'Ambrogio, every surface is covered with mosaics from the second half of the 5th century. Saint Victor is depicted in the center of the golden dome, while figures of saints are shown on the walls before a blue background. The low spandrels give space for the symbols of the four Evangelists.

Albingaunum was the main Roman port of Liguria. The octagonal baptistery of the town was decorated in the 5th century with high quality blue and white mosaics representing the Apostles. The surviving remains are somewhat fragmented. Massilia remained a thriving port and a Christian spiritual center in Southern Gaul where favourable societal and economic conditions ensured the survival of mosaic art in the 5th and 6th centuries. The large baptistery, once the grandest building of its kind in Western Europe, had a geometric floor mosaic which is only known from 19th century descriptions. Other parts of the episcopal complex were also decorated with mosaics as new finds, that were unearthed in the 2000s, attest. The funerary basilica of Saint Victor, built in a quarry outside the walls, was decorated with mosaics but only a small fragment with blue and green scrolls survived on the intrados of an arch (the basilica was later buried under a medieval abbey).

A mosaic pavement depicting humans, animals and plants from the original 4th-century cathedral of Aquileia has survived in the later medieval church. This mosaic adopts pagan motifs such as the Nilotic scene, but behind the traditional naturalistic content is Christian symbolism such as the ichthys. The 6th-century early Christian basilicas of Sant' Eufemia it:Basilica di Sant'Eufemia (Grado) and Santa Maria delle Grazie in Grado also have mosaic floors.

==== Ravenna ====
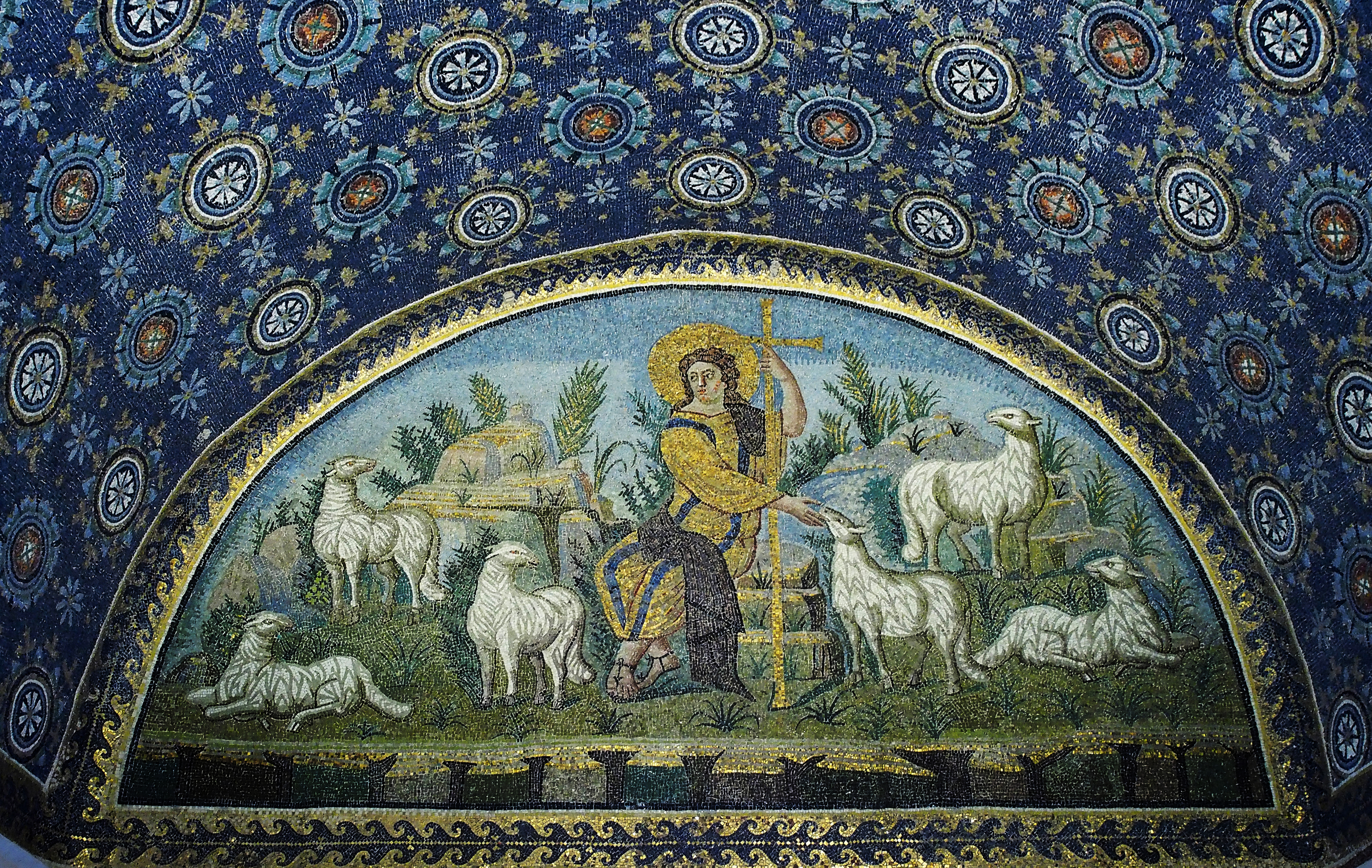
The Good Shepherd mosaic in the Mausoleum of Galla Placidia, Ravenna

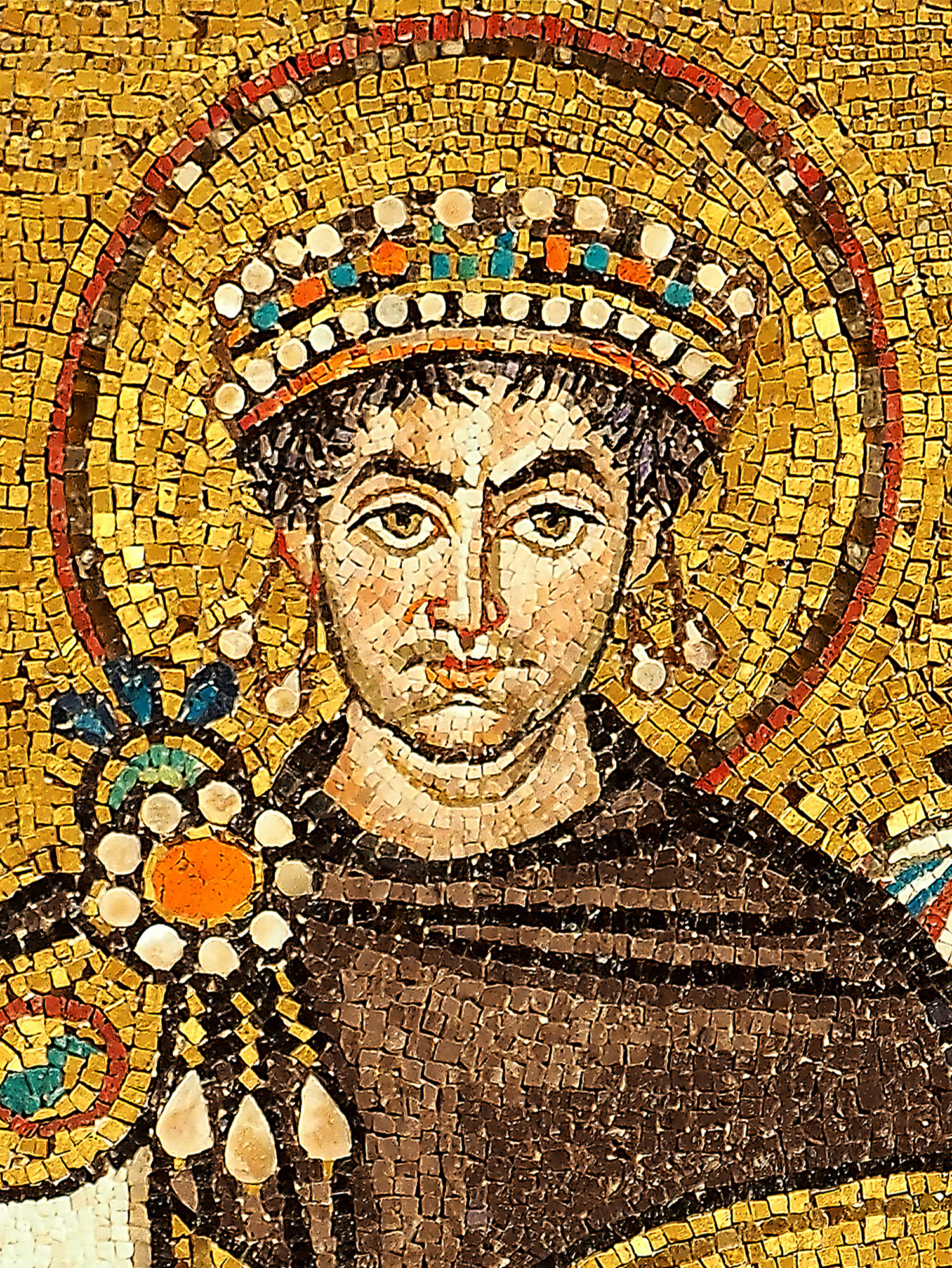
Mosaic of Justinian I in Basilica of San Vitale, Ravenna

In the 5th-century Ravenna, the capital of the Western Roman Empire, became the center of late Roman mosaic art. The Mausoleum of Galla Placidia was decorated with mosaics of high artistic quality in 425–430. The vaults of the small, cross-shaped structure are clad with mosaics on blue background. The central motif above the crossing is a golden cross in the middle of the starry sky. The wall mosaics depict scenes of Christ as the Good Shepherd and the martyrdom of Saint Lawrence. Another great building established by Galla Placidia was the church of San Giovanni Evangelista. She erected it in fulfillment of a vow that she made having escaped from a deadly storm in 425 on the sea voyage from Constantinople to Ravenna. The mosaics depicted the storm, portraits of members of the western and eastern imperial family and the bishop of Ravenna, Peter Chrysologus. They are known only from Renaissance sources because almost all were destroyed in 1747. The church building has since been restored.

Ostrogoths kept alive the tradition in the 6th century, as the mosaics of the Arian Baptistry, Baptistry of Neon, Archbishop's Chapel, and the earlier phase mosaics in the Basilica of San Vitale and Basilica of Sant'Apollinare Nuovo testify.

After 539, Ravenna was conquered by the Byzantines in the form of the Byzantine Empire (Eastern Roman Empire) and became the seat of the Exarchate of Ravenna. The greatest development of Christian mosaics unfolded in the second half of the 6th century. Outstanding examples of Byzantine mosaic art are the later phase mosaics in the Basilica of San Vitale and Basilica of Sant'Apollinare Nuovo. The mosaic depicting Emperor Saint Justinian I and Empress Theodora in the Basilica of San Vitale were executed shortly after the Byzantine conquest. The mosaics of the Basilica of Sant'Apollinare in Classe were made around 549. The anti-Arian theme is obvious in the apse mosaic of San Michele in Affricisco, executed in 545–547 (largely destroyed; the remains in Berlin).

The last example of Byzantine mosaics in Ravenna was commissioned by bishop Reparatus between 673 and 679 in the Basilica of Sant'Apollinare in Classe. The mosaic panel in the apse showing the bishop with Emperor Constantine IV is obviously an imitation of the Justinian panel in San Vitale.

==== Butrint ====
The mosaic pavement of the Vrina Plain basilica of Butrint, Albania appear to pre-date that of the Baptistery by almost a generation, dating to the last quarter of the 5th or the first years of the 6th century. The mosaic displays a variety of motifs including sea-creatures, birds, terrestrial beasts, fruits, flowers, trees and abstracts – designed to depict a terrestrial paradise of God's creation. Superimposed on this scheme are two large tablets, tabulae ansatae, carrying inscriptions. A variety of fish, a crab, a lobster, shrimps, mushrooms, flowers, a stag and two cruciform designs surround the smaller of the two inscriptions, which reads: In fulfilment of the vow (prayer) of those whose names God knows. This anonymous dedicatory inscription is a public demonstration of the benefactors' humility and an acknowledgement of God's omniscience.

The abundant variety of natural life depicted in the Butrint mosaics celebrates the richness of God's creation; some elements also have specific connotations. The kantharos vase and vine refer to the eucharist, the symbol of the sacrifice of Christ leading to salvation. Peacocks are symbols of paradise and resurrection; shown eating or drinking from the vase they indicate the route to eternal life. Deer or stags were commonly used as images of the faithful aspiring to Christ: "As the hart panteth after the water brooks, so panteth my soul after thee, O God." Water-birds and fish and other sea-creatures can indicate baptism as well as the members of the Church who are christened.

==== Late Antique and Early Medieval Rome ====
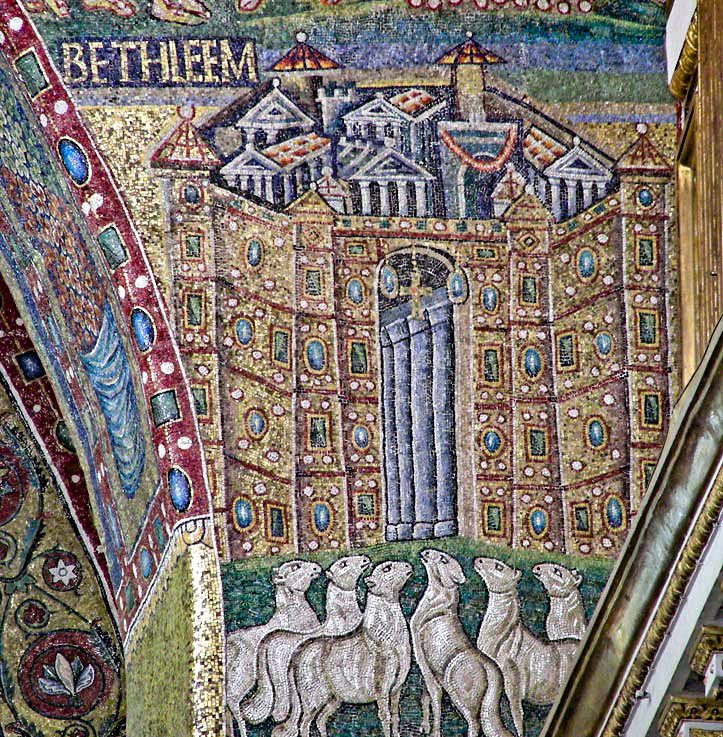
5th century mosaic in the triumphal arch of Santa Maria Maggiore, Rome

Christian mosaic art also flourished in Rome, gradually declining as conditions became more difficult in the Early Middle Ages. 5th century mosaics can be found over the triumphal arch and in the nave of the basilica of Santa Maria Maggiore. The 27 surviving panels of the nave are the most important mosaic cycle in Rome of this period. Two other important 5th century mosaics are lost but we know them from 17th-century drawings. In the apse mosaic of Sant'Agata dei Goti (462–472, destroyed in 1589) Christ was seated on a globe with the twelve Apostles flanking him, six on either side. At Sant'Andrea in Catabarbara (468–483, destroyed in 1686) Christ appeared in the center, flanked on either side by three Apostles. Four streams flowed from the little mountain supporting Christ. The original 5th-century apse mosaic of the Santa Sabina was replaced by a very similar fresco by Taddeo Zuccari in 1559. The composition probably remained unchanged: Christ flanked by male and female saints, seated on a hill while lambs drinking from a stream at its feet. All three mosaics had a similar iconography.

6th-century pieces are rare in Rome but the mosaics inside the triumphal arch of the basilica of San Lorenzo fuori le mura belong to this era. The Chapel of Ss. Primo e Feliciano in Santo Stefano Rotondo has very interesting and rare mosaics from the 7th century. This chapel was built by Pope Theodore I as a family burial place.

In the 7th–9th centuries Rome fell under the influence of Byzantine art, noticeable on the mosaics of Santa Prassede, Santa Maria in Domnica, Sant'Agnese fuori le Mura, Santa Cecilia in Trastevere, Santi Nereo e Achilleo and the San Venanzio chapel of San Giovanni in Laterano. The great dining hall of Pope Leo III in the Lateran Palace was also decorated with mosaics. They were all destroyed later except for one example, the so-called Triclinio Leoniano of which a copy was made in the 18th century. Another great work of Pope Leo, the apse mosaic of Santa Susanna, depicted Christ with the Pope and Charlemagne on one side, and SS. Susanna and Felicity on the other. It was plastered over during a renovation in 1585. Pope Paschal I (817–824) embellished the church of Santo Stefano del Cacco with an apsidal mosaic which depicted the pope with a model of the church (destroyed in 1607).

The fragment of an 8th-century mosaic, the Epiphany is one of the very rare remaining pieces of the medieval decoration of Old St. Peter's Basilica, demolished in the late 16th century. The precious fragment is kept in the sacristy of Santa Maria in Cosmedin. It proves the high artistic quality of the destroyed St. Peter's mosaics.

==== Byzantine mosaics ====
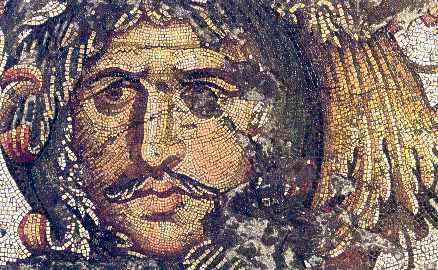
The so-called "Gothic chieftain", from the Mosaic peristyle of the Great Palace of Constantinople

Mosaics were more central to Byzantine culture than to that of Western Europe. Byzantine church interiors were generally covered with golden mosaics. Mosaic art flourished in the Byzantine Empire from the 6th to the 15th centuries. The majority of Byzantine mosaics were destroyed without trace during wars and conquests, but the surviving remains still form a fine collection.

The great buildings of Emperor Justinian like the Hagia Sophia in Constantinople, the Nea Church in Jerusalem and the rebuilt Church of the Nativity in Bethlehem were certainly embellished with mosaics but none of these survived.

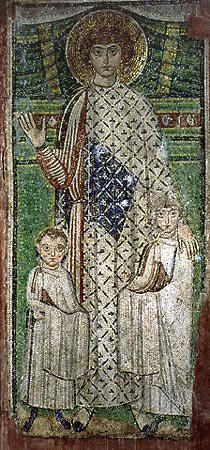
A pre-Iconoclastic depiction of St. Demetrios at the Hagios Demetrios Basilica in Thessaloniki.

Important fragments survived from the mosaic floor of the Great Palace of Constantinople which was commissioned during Justinian's reign. The figures, animals, plants all are entirely classical but they are scattered before a plain background. The portrait of a moustached man, probably a Gothic chieftain, is considered the most important surviving mosaic of the Justinianian age. The so-called small sekreton of the palace was built during Justin II's reign around 565–577. Some fragments survive from the mosaics of this vaulted room. The vine scroll motifs are very similar to those in the Santa Constanza and they still closely follow the Classical tradition. There are remains of floral decoration in the Church of the Acheiropoietos in Thessaloniki (5th–6th centuries).

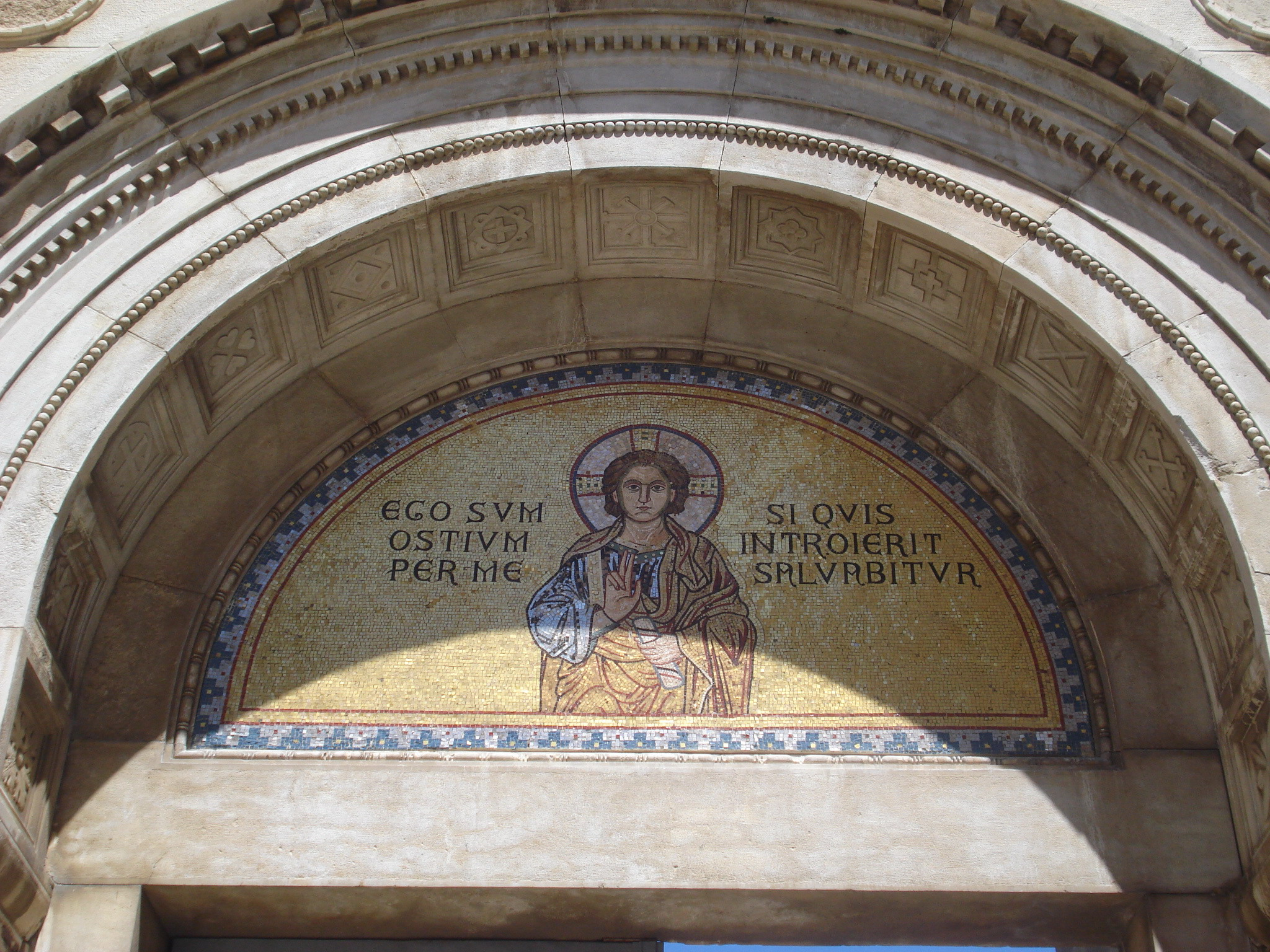
Byzantine mosaic above the entrance portal of the Euphrasian Basilica in Poreč, Croatia (6th century)

In the 6th century, Ravenna, the capital of Byzantine Italy, became the center of mosaic making. Istria also boasts some important examples from this era. The Euphrasian Basilica in Parentium was built in the middle of the 6th century and decorated with mosaics depicting the Theotokos flanked by angels and saints.

Fragments remain from the mosaics of the Church of Santa Maria Formosa in Pola. These pieces were made during the 6th century by artists from Constantinople. Their pure Byzantine style is different from the contemporary Ravennate mosaics.

Very few early Byzantine mosaics survived the Iconoclastic destruction of the 8th century. Among the rare examples are the 6th-century Christ in majesty (or Ezekiel's Vision) mosaic in the apse of the Church of Hosios David in Thessaloniki that was hidden behind mortar during those dangerous times. Nine mosaic panels in the Hagios Demetrios Church, which were made between 634 and 730, also escaped destruction. Unusually almost all represent Saint Demetrius of Thessaloniki, often with suppliants before him. This iconoclasm was almost certainly because of nearby Muslims' beliefs.

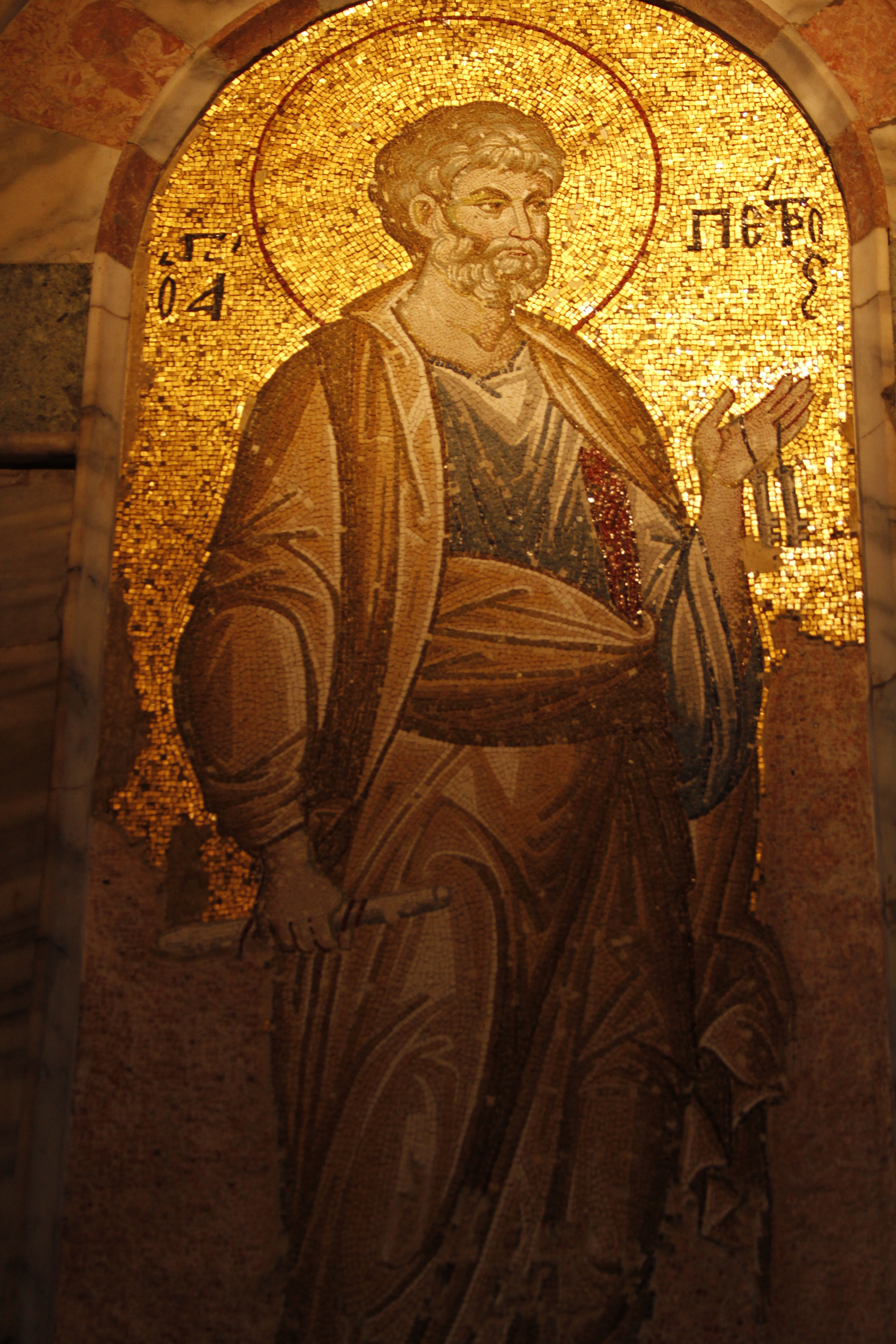
Saint Peter mosaic from the Chora Church

In the Iconoclastic era, figural mosaics were also condemned as idolatry. The Iconoclastic churches were embellished with plain gold mosaics with only one great cross in the apse like the Hagia Irene in Constantinople (after 740). There were similar crosses in the apses of the Hagia Sophia Church in Thessaloniki and in the Church of the Dormition in Nicaea. The crosses were substituted with the image of the Theotokos in both churches after the victory of the Iconodules (787–797 and in 8th–9th centuries respectively, the Dormition church was totally destroyed in 1922).

A similar Theotokos image flanked by two archangels were made for the Hagia Sophia in Constantinople in 867. The dedication inscription says: "The images which the impostors had cast down here pious emperors have again set up." In the 870s the so-called large sekreton of the Great Palace of Constantinople was decorated with the images of the four great iconodule patriarchs.

The post-Iconoclastic era was the heyday of Byzantine art with the most beautiful mosaics executed. The mosaics of the Macedonian Renaissance (867–1056) carefully mingled traditionalism with innovation. Constantinopolitan mosaics of this age followed the decoration scheme first used in Emperor Basil I's Nea Ekklesia. Not only this prototype was later totally destroyed but each surviving composition is battered so it is necessary to move from church to church to reconstruct the system.

An interesting set of Macedonian-era mosaics make up the decoration of the Hosios Loukas Monastery. In the narthex there is the Crucifixion, the Pantokrator and the Anastasis above the doors, while in the church the Theotokos (apse), Pentecost, scenes from Christ's life and ermit St Loukas (all executed before 1048). The scenes are treated with a minimum of detail and the panels are dominated with the gold setting.

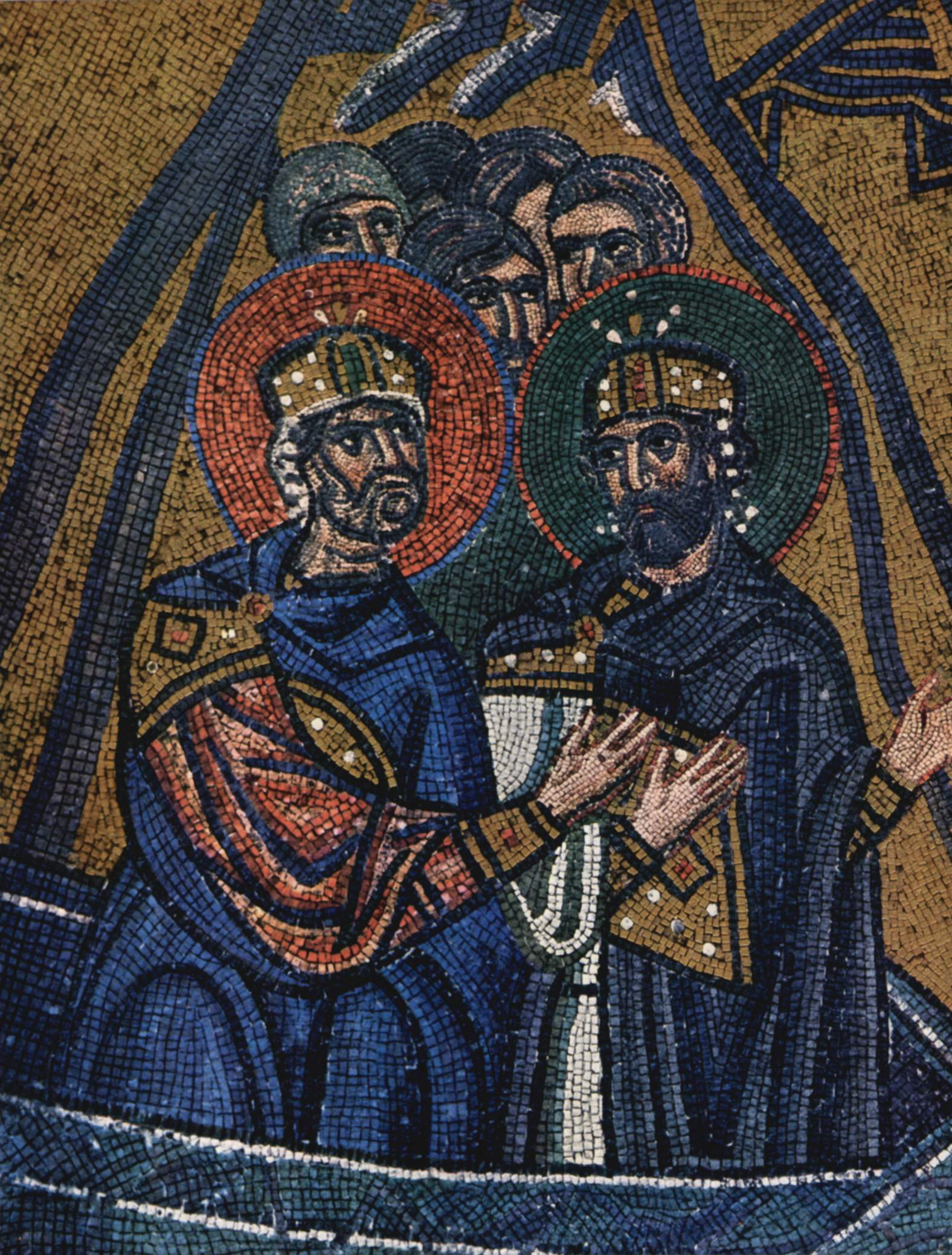
Detail of mosaic from Nea Moni Monastery

The Nea Moni Monastery on Chios was established by Constantine Monomachos in 1043–1056. The exceptional mosaic decoration of the dome showing probably the nine orders of the angels was destroyed in 1822 but other panels survived (Theotokos with raised hands, four evangelists with seraphim, scenes from Christ's life and an interesting Anastasis where King Salomon bears resemblance to Constantine Monomachos). In comparison with Osios Loukas Nea Moni mosaics contain more figures, detail, landscape and setting.

Another great undertaking by Constantine Monomachos was the restoration of the Church of the Holy Sepulchre in Jerusalem between 1042 and 1048. Nothing survived of the mosaics which covered the walls and the dome of the edifice but the Russian abbot Daniel, who visited Jerusalem in 1106–1107 left a description: "Lively mosaics of the holy prophets are under the ceiling, over the tribune. The altar is surmounted by a mosaic image of Christ. In the main altar one can see the mosaic of the Exaltation of Adam. In the apse the Ascension of Christ. The Annunciation occupies the two pillars next to the altar."

The Daphni Monastery houses the best-preserved complex of mosaics from the early Comnenan period (c. 1100), when the austere and hieratic manner of the Macedonian epoch—represented by the Christ Pantocrator image inside the dome—was metamorphosing into a more delicate style.

The 9th- and 10th-century mosaics of the Hagia Sophia in Constantinople are truly classical Byzantine artworks. The north and south tympana beneath the dome was decorated with figures of prophets, saints and patriarchs. Above the principal door from the narthex we can see an Emperor kneeling before Christ (late 9th or early 10th century). Above the door from the southwest vestibule to the narthex another mosaic shows the Theotokos with Justinian and Constantine. Justinian I is offering the model of the church to Mary while Constantine is holding a model of the city in his hand. Both emperors are beardless – this is an example for conscious archaization as contemporary Byzantine rulers were bearded. A mosaic panel on the gallery shows Christ with Constantine Monomachos and Empress Zoe (1042–1055). The emperor gives a bulging money sack to Christ as a donation for the church.

The dome of the Hagia Sophia Church in Thessaloniki is decorated with an Ascension mosaic (c. 885). The composition resembles the great baptistries in Ravenna, with apostles standing between palms and Christ in the middle. The scheme is somewhat unusual as the standard post-Iconoclastic formula for domes contained only the image of the Pantokrator.

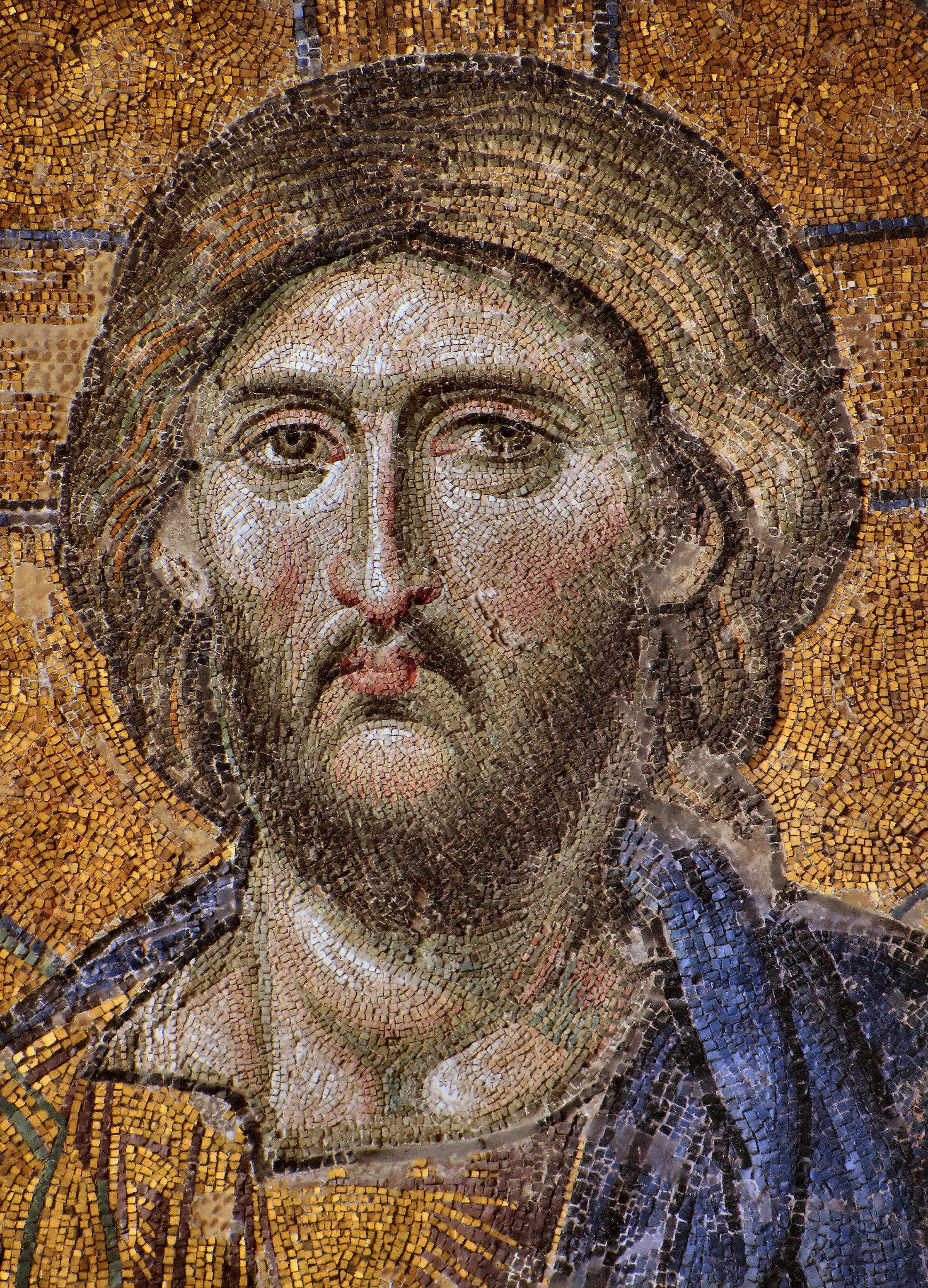
Mosaic of Christ Pantocrator from Hagia Sophia from the Deesis mosaic.

There are very few existing mosaics from the Komnenian period but this paucity must be due to accidents of survival and gives a misleading impression. The only surviving 12th-century mosaic work in Constantinople is a panel in Hagia Sophia depicting Emperor John II and Empress Eirene with the Theotokos (1122–34). The empress with her long braided hair and rosy cheeks is especially capturing. It must be a lifelike portrayal because Eirene was really a redhead as her original Hungarian name, Piroska shows. The adjacent portrait of Emperor Alexios I Komnenos on a pier (from 1122) is similarly personal. The imperial mausoleum of the Komnenos dynasty, the Pantokrator Monastery was certainly decorated with great mosaics but these were later destroyed. The lack of Komnenian mosaics outside the capital is even more apparent. There is only a "Communion of the Apostles" in the apse of the cathedral of Serres.

A striking technical innovation of the Komnenian period was the production of very precious, miniature mosaic icons. In these icons the small tesserae (with sides of 1 mm or less) were set on wax or resin on a wooden panel. These products of extraordinary craftmanship were intended for private devotion. The Louvre Transfiguration is a very fine example from the late 12th century. The miniature mosaic of Christ in the Museo Nazionale at Florence illustrates the more gentle, humanistic conception of Christ which appeared in the 12th century.

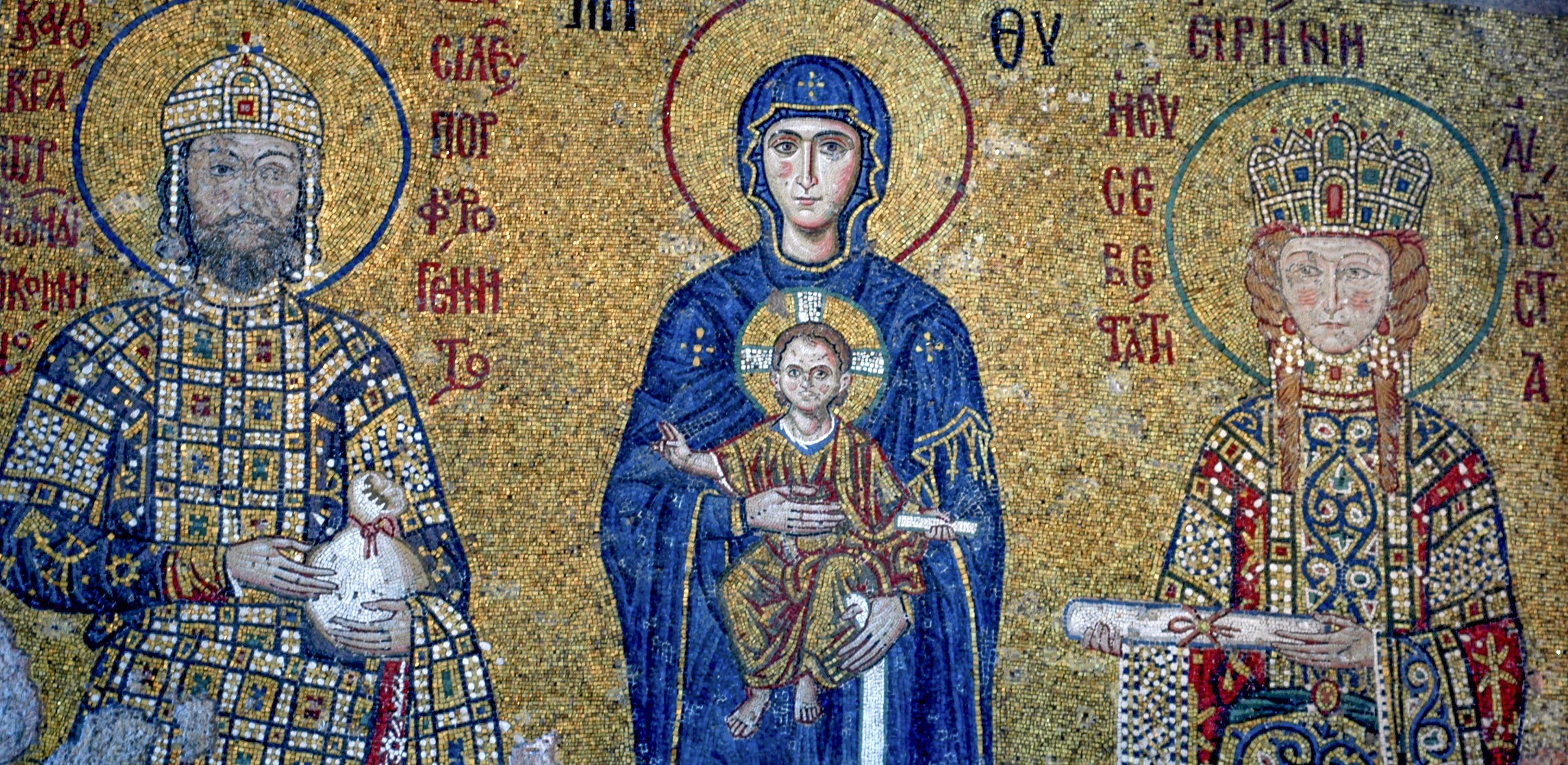
A mosaic from the Hagia Sophia of Constantinople (modern Istanbul), depicting Mary and Jesus, flanked by John II Komnenos (left) and his wife Irene of Hungary (right), c. 1118 AD

The sack of Constantinople in 1204 caused the decline of mosaic art for the next five decades. After the reconquest of the city by Michael VIII Palaiologos in 1261 the Hagia Sophia was restored and a beautiful new Deesis was made on the south gallery. This huge mosaic panel with figures two and a half times lifesize is really overwhelming due to its grand scale and superlative craftsmanship. The Hagia Sophia Deesis is probably the most famous Byzantine mosaic in Constantinople.

The Pammakaristos Monastery was restored by Michael Glabas, an imperial official, in the late 13th century. Only the mosaic decoration of the small burial chapel (parekklesion) of Glabas survived. This domed chapel was built by his widow, Martha around 1304–08. In the miniature dome the traditional Pantokrator can be seen with twelve prophets beneath. Unusually the apse is decorated with a Deesis, probably due to the funerary function of the chapel.

The Church of the Holy Apostles in Thessaloniki was built in 1310–14. Although some vandal systematically removed the gold tesserae of the background it can be seen that the Pantokrator and the prophets in the dome follow the traditional Byzantine pattern. Many details are similar to the Pammakaristos mosaics so it is supposed that the same team of mosaicists worked in both buildings. Another building with a related mosaic decoration is the Theotokos Paregoritissa Church in Arta. The church was established by the Despot of Epirus in 1294–96. In the dome is the traditional stern Pantokrator, with prophets and cherubim below.

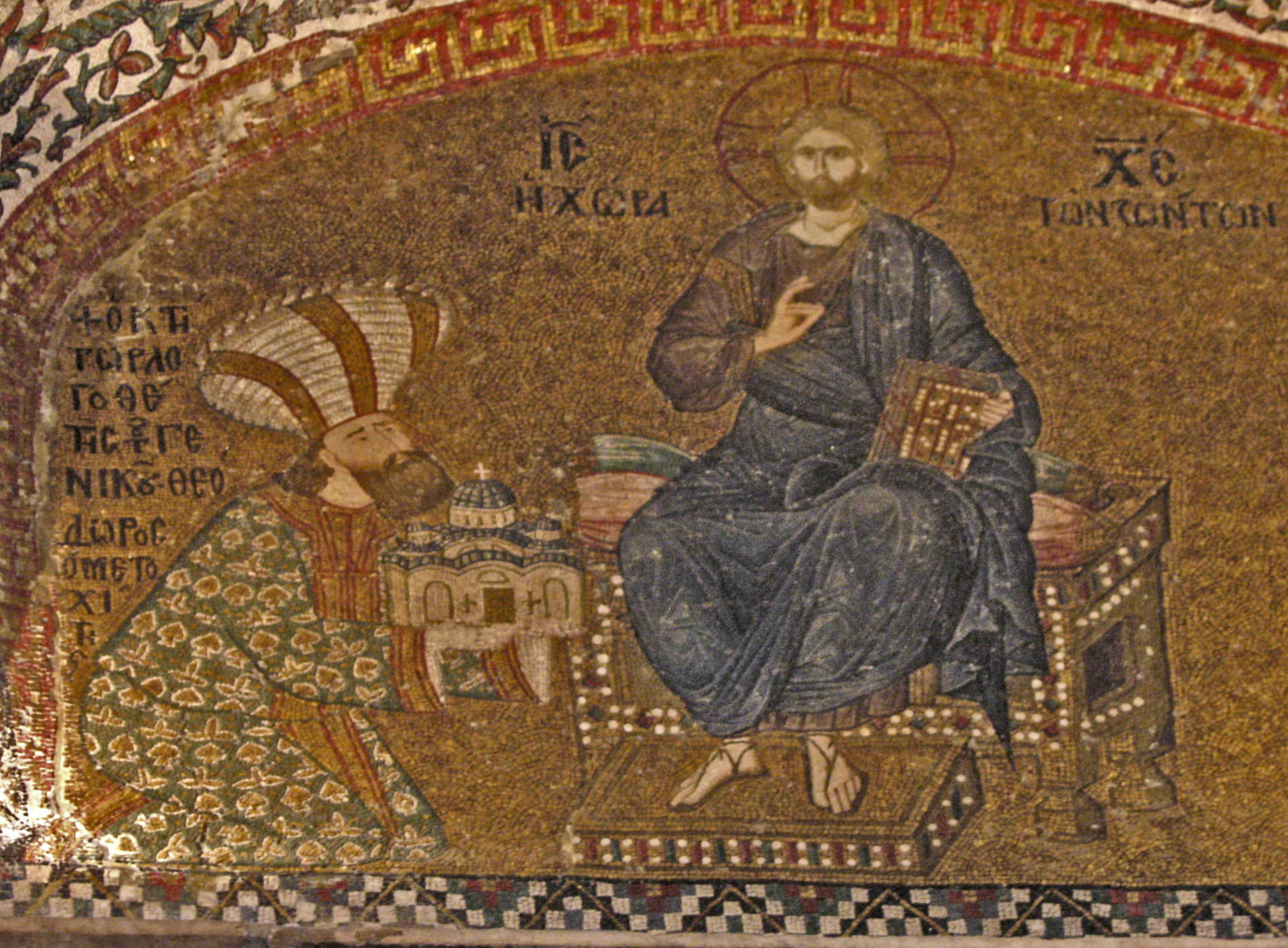
Mosaic of Theodore Metochites offering the Chora Church to Christ

The greatest mosaic work of the Palaeologan renaissance in art is the decoration of the Chora Church in Constantinople. Although the mosaics of the naos have not survived except three panels, the decoration of the exonarthex and the esonarthex constitute the most important full-scale mosaic cycle in Constantinople after the Hagia Sophia. They were executed around 1320 by the command of Theodore Metochites. The esonarthex has two fluted domes, specially created to provide the ideal setting for the mosaic images of the ancestors of Christ. The southern one is called the Dome of the Pantokrator while the northern one is the Dome of the Theotokos. The most important panel of the esonarthex depicts Theodore Metochites wearing a huge turban, offering the model of the church to Christ. The walls of both narthexes are decorated with mosaic cycles from the life of the Virgin and the life of Christ. These panels show the influence of the Italian trecento on Byzantine art especially the more natural settings, landscapes, figures.

The last Byzantine mosaic work was created for the Hagia Sophia, Constantinople in the middle of the 14th century. The great eastern arch of the cathedral collapsed in 1346, bringing down the third of the main dome. By 1355 not only the big Pantokrator image was restored but new mosaics were set on the eastern arch depicting the Theotokos, the Baptist and Emperor John V Palaiologos (discovered only in 1989).

In addition to the large-scale monuments several miniature mosaic icons of outstanding quality was produced for the Palaiologos court and nobles. The loveliest examples from the 14th century are Annunciation in the Victoria and Albert Museum and a mosaic diptych in the Cathedral Treasury of Florence representing the Twelve Feasts of the Church.

In the troubled years of the 15th century the fatally weakened empire could not afford luxurious mosaics. Churches were decorated with wall-paintings in this era and after the Turkish conquest.

==== Rome in the High Middle Ages ====
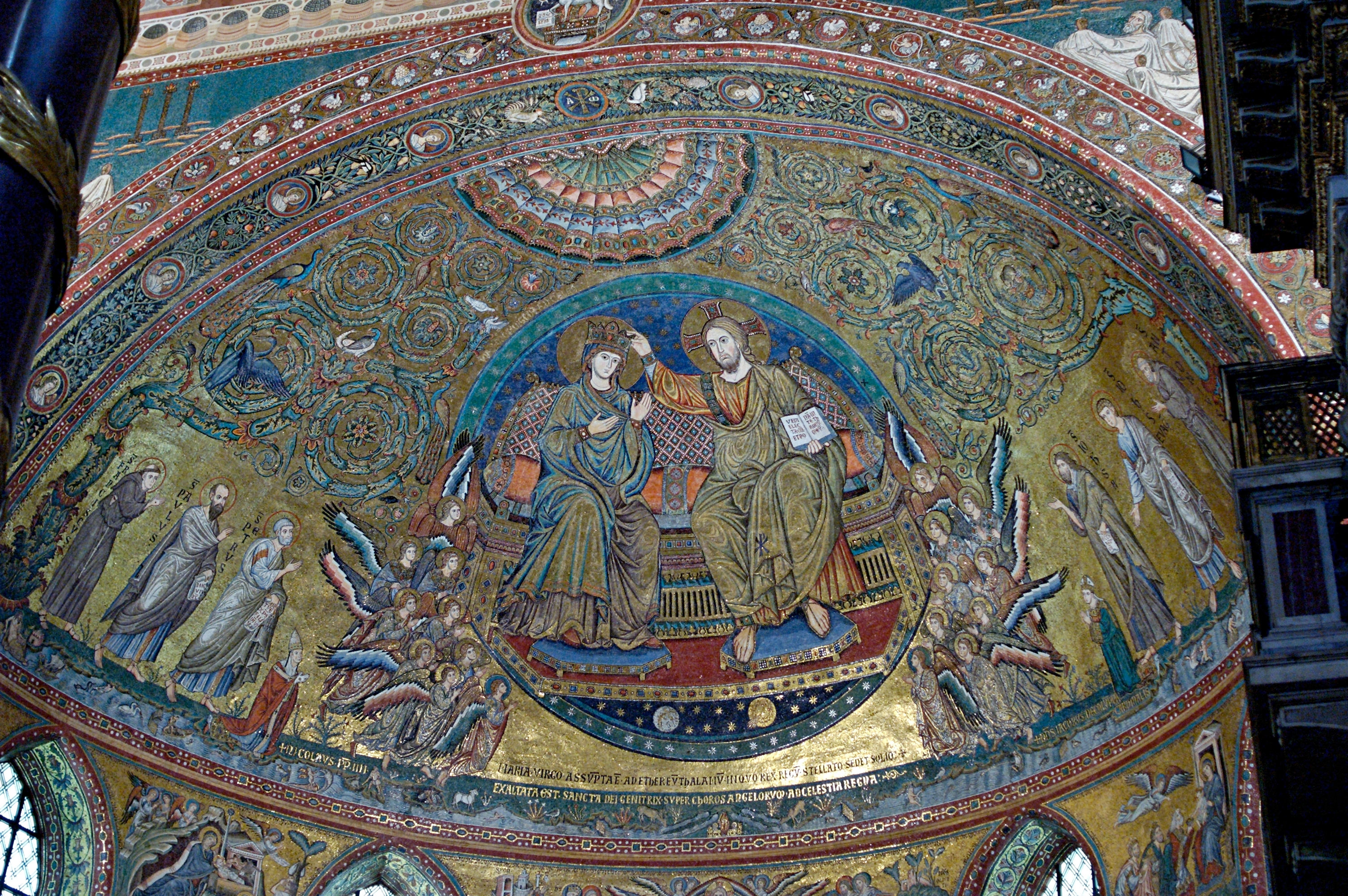
Apse mosaic in the Santa Maria Maggiore

The last great period of Roman mosaic art was the 12th–13th century when Rome developed its own distinctive artistic style, free from the strict rules of eastern tradition and with a more realistic portrayal of figures in the space. Well-known works of this period are the floral mosaics of the Basilica di San Clemente, the façade of Santa Maria in Trastevere and San Paolo fuori le Mura. The beautiful apse mosaic of Santa Maria in Trastevere (1140) depicts Christ and Mary sitting next to each other on the heavenly throne, the first example of this iconographic scheme. A similar mosaic, the Coronation of the Virgin, decorates the apse of Santa Maria Maggiore. It is a work of Jacopo Torriti from 1295. The mosaics of Torriti and Jacopo da Camerino in the apse of San Giovanni in Laterano from 1288 to 1294 were thoroughly restored in 1884. The apse mosaic of San Crisogono is attributed to Pietro Cavallini, the greatest Roman painter of the 13th century. Six scenes from the life of Mary in Santa Maria in Trastevere were also executed by Cavallini in 1290. These mosaics are praised for their realistic portrayal and attempts at perspective. There is an interesting mosaic medallion from 1210 above the gate of the church of San Tommaso in Formis showing Christ enthroned between a white and a black slave. The church belonged to the Order of the Trinitarians which was devoted to ransoming Christian slaves.

The great Navicella mosaic (1305–1313) in the atrium of the Old St. Peter's is attributed to Giotto di Bondone. The giant mosaic, commissioned by Cardinal Jacopo Stefaneschi, was originally situated on the eastern porch of the old basilica and occupied the whole wall above the entrance arcade facing the courtyard. It depicted St. Peter walking on the waters. This extraordinary work was mainly destroyed during the construction of the new St. Peter's in the 17th century. Navicella means "little ship" referring to the large boat which dominated the scene, and whose sail, filled by the storm, loomed over the horizon. Such a natural representation of a seascape was known only from ancient works of art.

==== Sicily ====
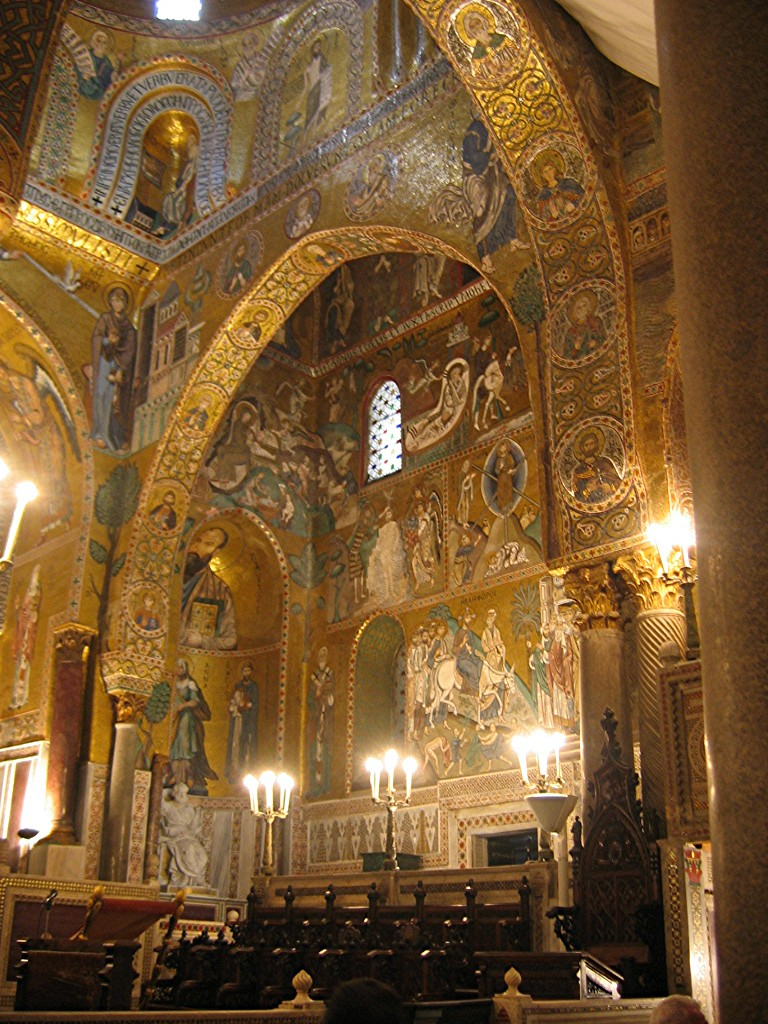
Arabic arches and Byzantine mosaics in the Cappella Palatina of Roger II of Sicily

The heyday of mosaic making in Sicily was the age of the independent Norman kingdom in the 12th century. The Norman kings adopted the Byzantine tradition of mosaic decoration to enhance the somewhat dubious legality of their rule. Greek masters working in Sicily developed their own style, that shows the influence of Western European and Islamic artistic tendencies. Best examples of Sicilian mosaic art are the Cappella Palatina of Roger II, the Martorana church in Palermo and the cathedrals of Cefalù and Monreale.

The Cappella Palatina clearly shows evidence for blending the eastern and western styles. The dome (1142–42) and the eastern end of the church (1143–1154) were decorated with typical Byzantine mosaics i.e. Pantokrator, angels, scenes from the life of Christ. Even the inscriptions are written in Greek. The narrative scenes of the nave (Old Testament, life of Sts Peter and Paul) are resembling to the mosaics of the Old St. Peter's and St. Paul's Basilica in Rome (Latin inscriptions, 1154–66).

The Martorana church (decorated around 1143) looked originally even more Byzantine although important parts were later demolished. The dome mosaic is similar to that of the Cappella Palatina, with Christ enthroned in the middle and four bowed, elongated angels. The Greek inscriptions, decorative patterns, and evangelists in the squinches are obviously executed by the same Greek masters who worked on the Cappella Palatina. The mosaic depicting Roger II of Sicily, dressed in Byzantine imperial robes and receiving the crown by Christ, was originally in the demolished narthex together with another panel, the Theotokos with Georgios of Antiochia, the founder of the church.

In Cefalù (1148) only the high, French Gothic presbytery was covered with mosaics: the Pantokrator on the semidome of the apse and cherubim on the vault. On the walls are Latin and Greek saints, with Greek inscriptions.

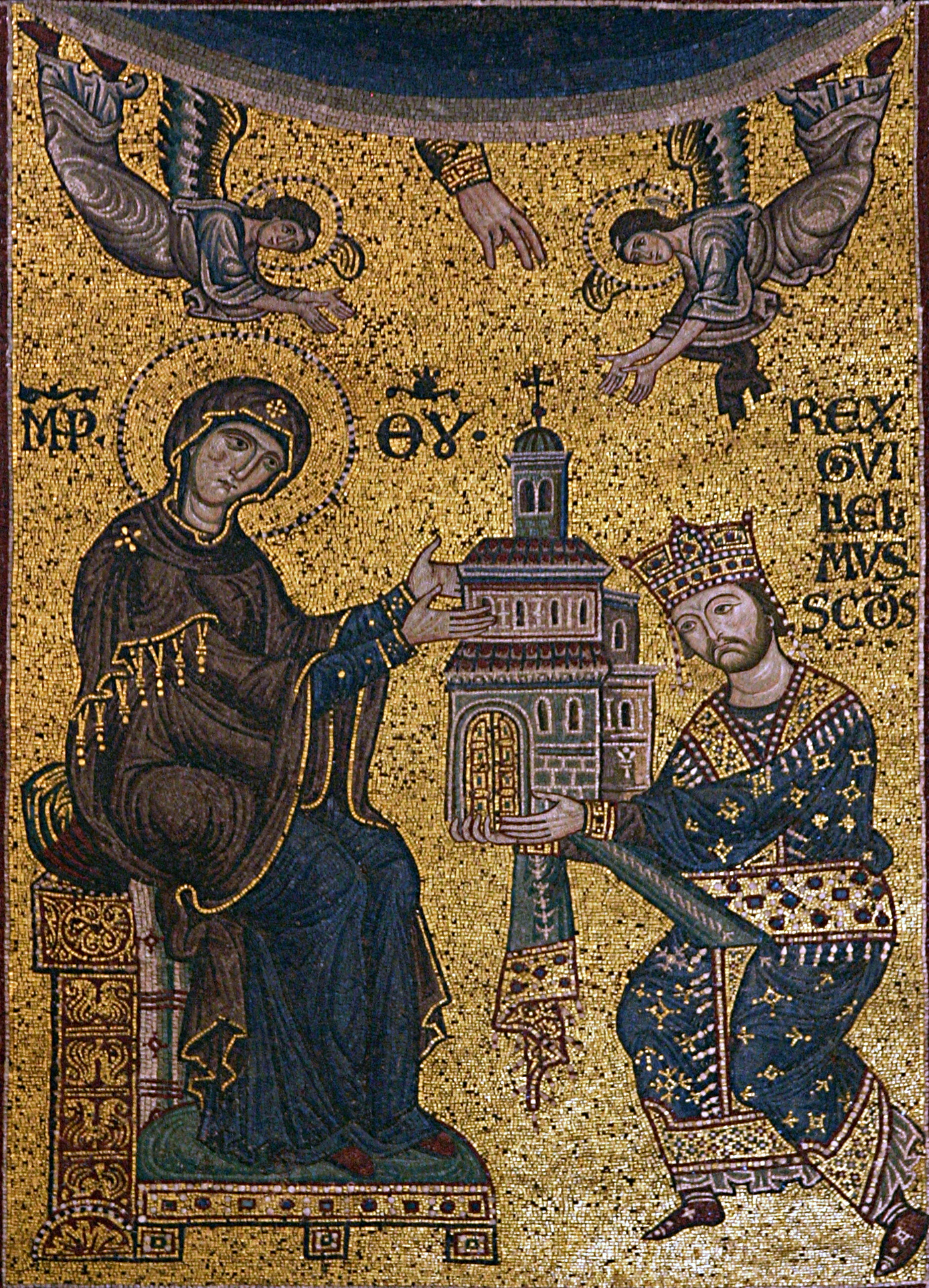
Monreale mosaics: William II offering the Monreale Cathedral to the Virgin Mary

The Monreale mosaics constitute the largest decoration of this kind in Italy, covering 0,75 hectares with at least 100 million glass and stone tesserae. This huge work was executed between 1176 and 1186 by the order of King William II of Sicily. The iconography of the mosaics in the presbytery is similar to Cefalu while the pictures in the nave are almost the same as the narrative scenes in the Cappella Palatina. The Martorana mosaic of Roger II blessed by Christ was repeated with the figure of King William II instead of his predecessor. Another panel shows the king offering the model of the cathedral to the Theotokos.

The Cathedral of Palermo, rebuilt by Archbishop Walter in the same time (1172–85), was also decorated with mosaics but none of these survived except the 12th-century image of Madonna del Tocco above the western portal.

The cathedral of Messina, consecrated in 1197, was also decorated with a great mosaic cycle, originally on par with Cefalù and Monreale, but heavily damaged and restored many times later. In the left apse of the same cathedral 14th-century mosaics survived, representing the Madonna and Child between Saints Agata and Lucy, the Archangels Gabriel and Michael and Queens Eleonora and Elisabetta.

Southern Italy was also part of the Norman kingdom but great mosaics did not survive in this area except the fine mosaic pavement of the Otranto Cathedral from 1166, with mosaics tied into a tree of life, mostly still preserved. The scenes depict biblical characters, warrior kings, medieval beasts, allegories of the months and working activity. Only fragments survived from the original mosaic decoration of Amalfi's Norman Cathedral. The mosaic ambos in the churches of Ravello prove that mosaic art was widespread in Southern Italy during the 11th–13th centuries.

The palaces of the Norman kings were decorated with mosaics depicting animals and landscapes. The secular mosaics are seemingly more Eastern in character than the great religious cycles and show a strong Persian influence. The most notable examples are the Sala di Ruggero in the Palazzo dei Normanni, Palermo and the Sala della Fontana in the Zisa summer palace, both from the 12th century.

==== Venice ====
In parts of Italy, which were under eastern artistic influences, like Sicily and Venice, mosaic making never went out of fashion in the Middle Ages. The whole interior of the St Mark's Basilica in Venice is clad with elaborate, golden mosaics. The oldest scenes were executed by Greek masters in the late 11th century but the majority of the mosaics are works of local artists from the 12th–13th centuries. The decoration of the church was finished only in the 16th century. One hundred and ten scenes of mosaics in the atrium of St Mark's were based directly on the miniatures of the Cotton Genesis, a Byzantine manuscript that was brought to Venice after the sack of Constantinople (1204). The mosaics were executed in the 1220s.

Other important Venetian mosaics can be found in the Cathedral of Santa Maria Assunta in Torcello from the 12th century, and in the Basilical of Santi Maria e Donato in Murano with a restored apse mosaic from the 12th century and a beautiful mosaic pavement (1140). The apse of the San Cipriano Church in Murano was decorated with an impressive golden mosaic from the early 13th century showing Christ enthroned with Mary, St John and the two patron saints, Cipriano and Cipriana. When the church was demolished in the 19th century, the mosaic was bought by Frederick William IV of Prussia. It was reassembled in the Friedenskirche of Potsdam in the 1840s.

Trieste was also an important center of mosaic art. The mosaics in the apse of the Cathedral of San Giusto were laid by master craftsmen from Veneto in the 12th–13th centuries.

==== Medieval Italy ====
The monastery of Grottaferrata founded by Greek Basilian monks and consecrated by the Pope in 1024 was decorated with Italo-Byzantine mosaics, some of which survived in the narthex and the interior. The mosaics on the triumphal chancel arch portray the Twelve Apostles sitting beside an empty throne, evoking Christ's ascent to Heaven. It is a Byzantine work of the 12th century. There is a beautiful 11th-century Deesis above the main portal.

The Abbot of Monte Cassino, Desiderius sent envoys to Constantinople some time after 1066 to hire expert Byzantine mosaicists for the decoration of the rebuilt abbey church. According to chronicler Leo of Ostia the Greek artists decorated the apse, the arch and the vestibule of the basilica. Their work was admired by contemporaries but was totally destroyed in later centuries except two fragments depicting greyhounds (now in the Monte Cassino Museum). "The abbot in his wisdom decided that great number of young monks in the monastery should be thoroughly initiated in these arts" – says the chronicler about the role of the Greeks in the revival of mosaic art in medieval Italy.

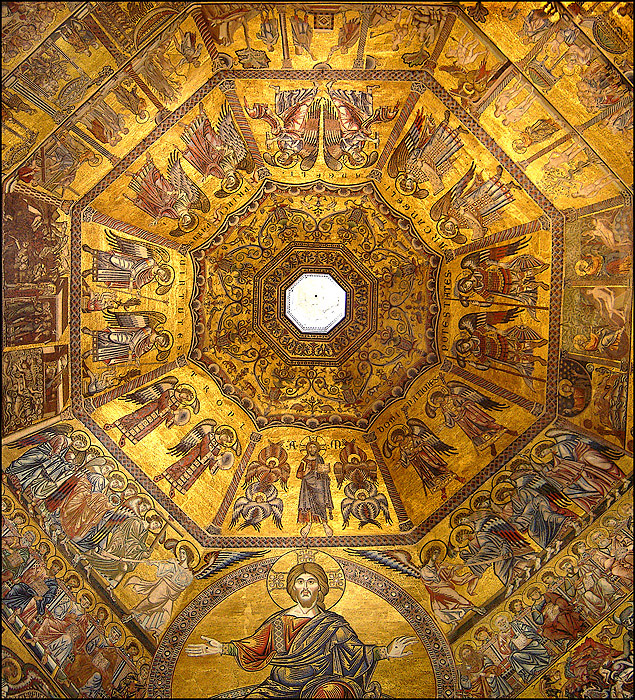
Florence Baptistry

In Florence a magnificent mosaic of the Last Judgement decorates the dome of the Baptistery. The earliest mosaics, works of art of many unknown Venetian craftsmen (including probably Cimabue), date from 1225. The covering of the ceiling was probably not completed until the 14th century.

The impressive mosaic of Christ in Majesty, flanked by the Virgin Mary and St. John the Evangelist in the apse of the cathedral of Pisa was designed by Cimabue in 1302. It evokes the Monreale mosaics in style. It survived the great fire of 1595 which destroyed most of the medieval interior decoration.

Sometimes not only church interiors but façades were also decorated with mosaics in Italy like in the case of the St Mark's Basilica in Venice (mainly from the 17th–19th centuries, but the oldest one from 1270 to 1275, "The burial of St Mark in the first basilica"), the Cathedral of Orvieto (golden Gothic mosaics from the 14th century, many times redone) and the Basilica di San Frediano in Lucca (huge, striking golden mosaic representing the Ascension of Christ with the apostles below, designed by Berlinghiero Berlinghieri in the 13th century). The Cathedral of Spoleto is also decorated on the upper façade with a huge mosaic portraying the Blessing Christ (signed by one Solsternus from 1207).

==== Western and Central Europe ====
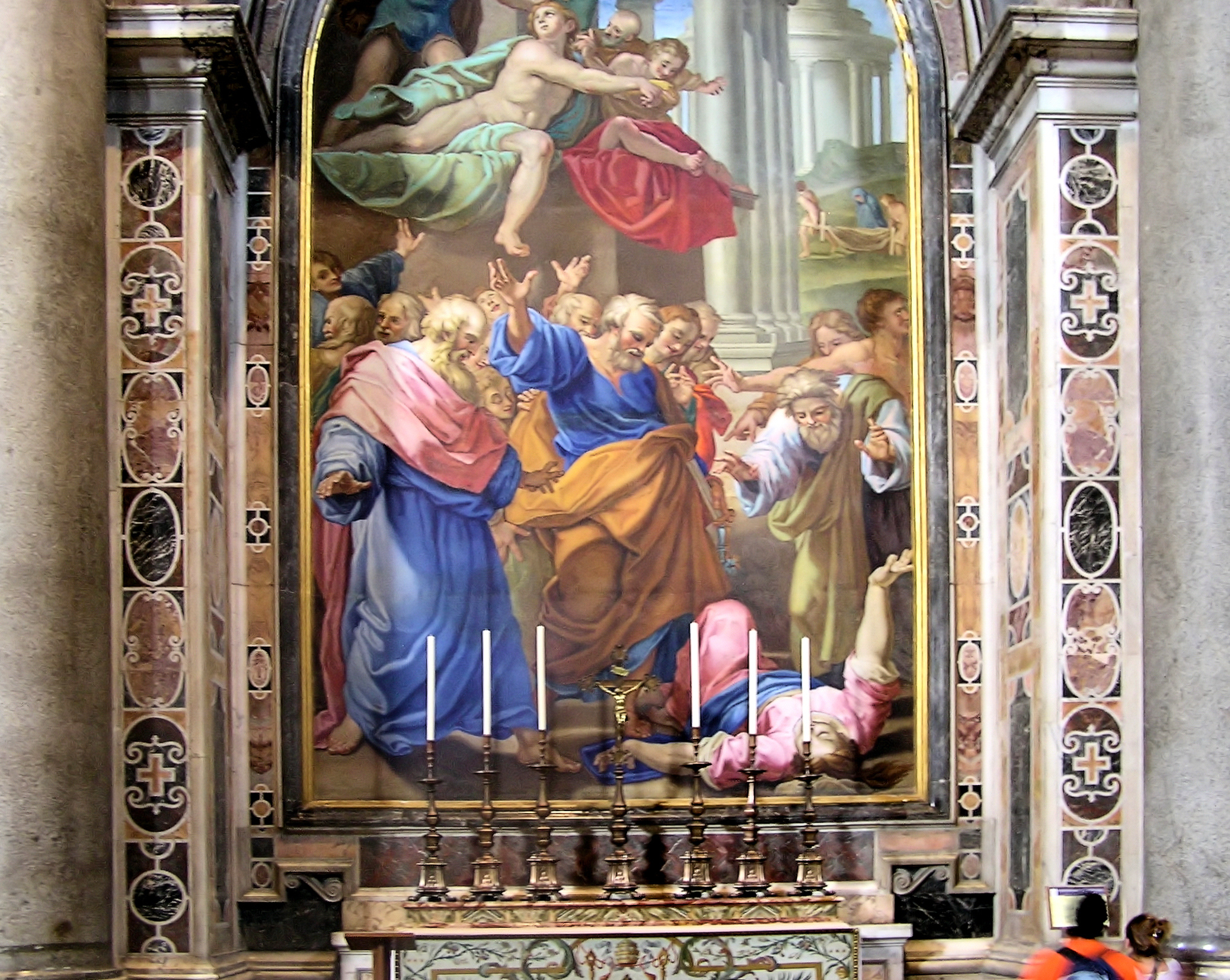
A "painting" made from tesserae in St. Peter's Basilica, Vatican State, Italy

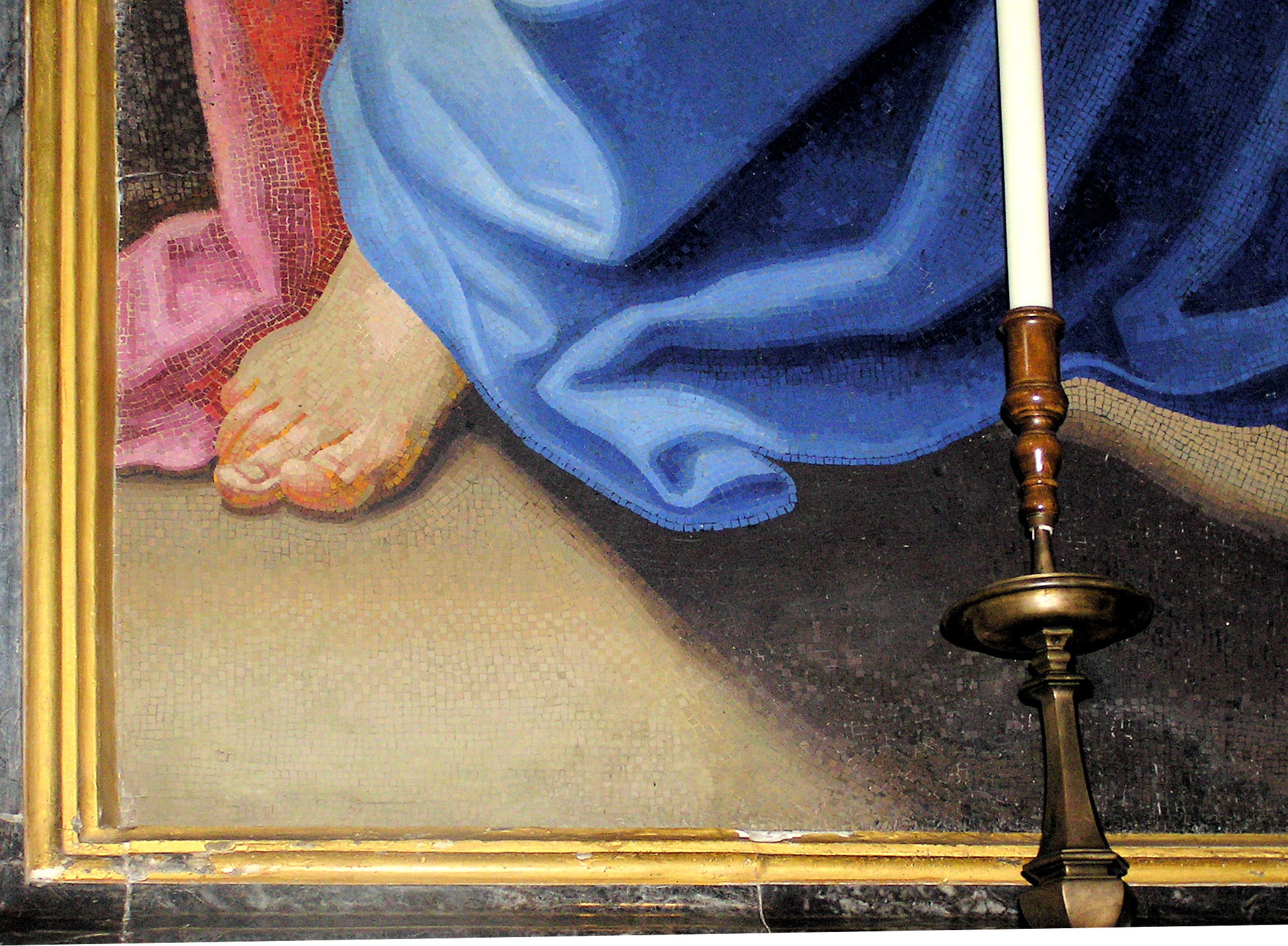
Close up of the bottom left corner of the picture above. Click the picture to see the individual tesserae

Beyond the Alps the first important example of mosaic art was the decoration of the Palatine Chapel in Aachen, commissioned by Charlemagne. It was completely destroyed in a fire in 1650. A rare example of surviving Carolingian mosaics is the apse semi-dome decoration of the oratory of Germigny-des-Prés built in 805–806 by Theodulf, bishop of Orléans, a leading figure of the Carolingian Renaissance. This unique work of art, rediscovered only in the 19th century, had no followers.

Only scant remains prove that mosaics were still used in the Early Middle Ages. The Abbey of Saint-Martial in Limoges, originally an important place of pilgrimage, was totally demolished during the French Revolution except its crypt which was rediscovered in the 1960s. A mosaic panel was unearthed which was dated to the 9th century. It somewhat incongruously uses cubes of gilded glass and deep green marble, probably taken from antique pavements. This could also be the case with the early 9th century mosaic found under the Basilica of Saint-Quentin in Picardy, where antique motifs are copied but using only simple colors. The mosaics in the Cathedral of Saint-Jean at Lyon have been dated to the 11th century because they employ the same non-antique simple colors. More fragments were found on the site of Saint-Croix at Poitiers which might be from the 6th or 9th century.

Later fresco replaced the more labor-intensive technique of mosaic in Western-Europe, although mosaics were sometimes used as decoration on medieval cathedrals. The Royal Basilica of the Hungarian kings in Székesfehérvár (Alba Regia) had a mosaic decoration in the apse. It was probably a work of Venetian or Ravennese craftsmen, executed in the first decades of the 11th century. The mosaic was almost totally destroyed together with the basilica in the 17th century. The Golden Gate of the St. Vitus Cathedral in Prague got its name from the golden 14th-century mosaic of the Last Judgement above the portal. It was executed by Venetian craftsmen.

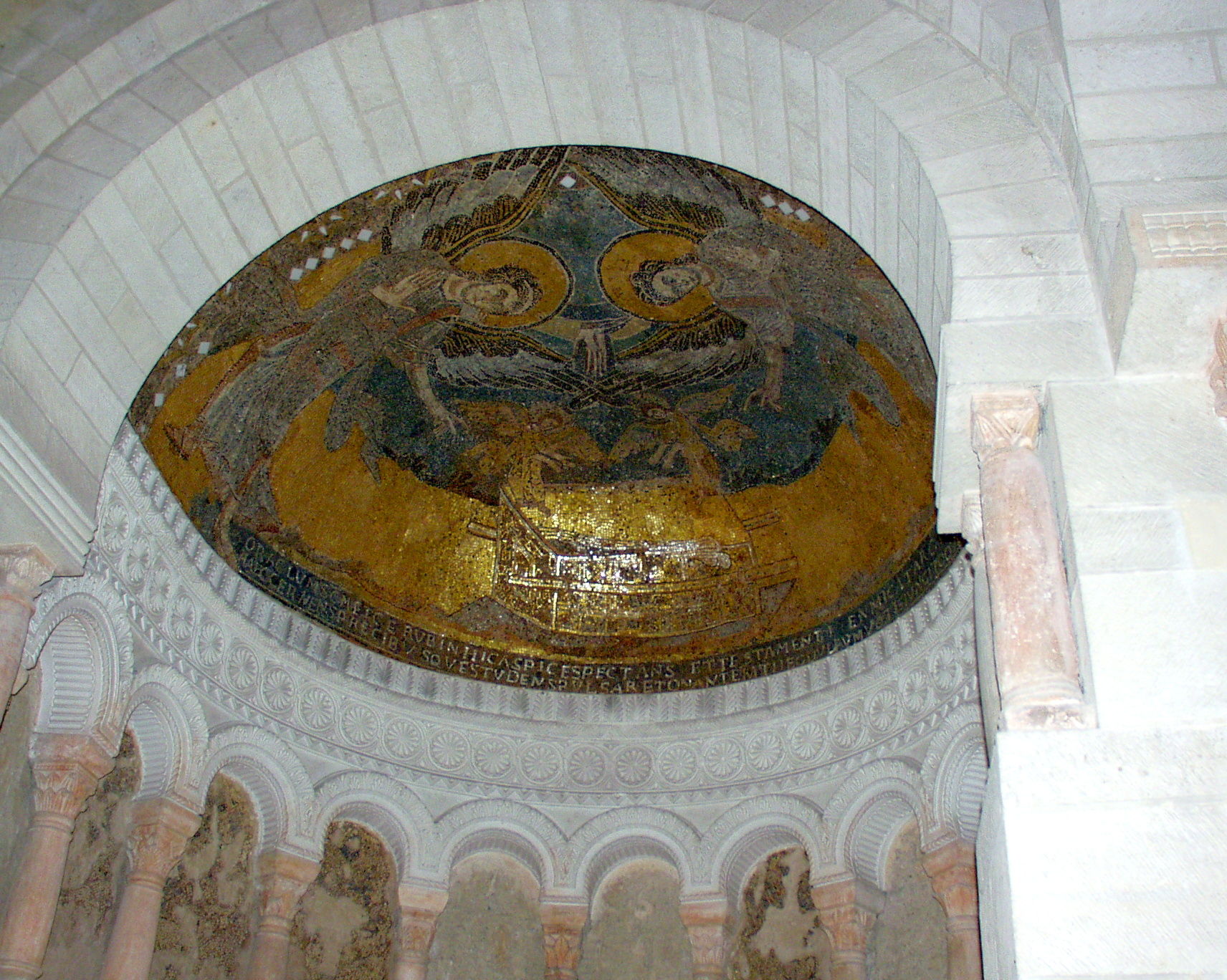
Carolingian mosaic in Germigny-des-Prés

The Crusaders in the Holy Land also adopted mosaic decoration under local Byzantine influence. During their 12th-century reconstruction of the Church of the Holy Sepulchre in Jerusalem they complemented the existing Byzantine mosaics with new ones. Almost nothing of them survived except the "Ascension of Christ" in the Latin Chapel (now confusingly surrounded by many 20th-century mosaics). More substantial fragments were preserved from the 12th-century mosaic decoration of the Church of the Nativity in Bethlehem. The mosaics in the nave are arranged in five horizontal bands with the figures of the ancestors of Christ, Councils of the Church and angels. In the apses the Annunciation, the Nativity, Adoration of the Magi and Dormition of the Blessed Virgin can be seen. The program of redecoration of the church was completed in 1169 as a unique collaboration of the Byzantine emperor, the king of Jerusalem and the Latin Church.

In 2003, the remains of a mosaic pavement were discovered under the ruins of the Bizere Monastery near the River Mureş in present-day Romania. The panels depict real or fantastic animal, floral, solar and geometric representations. Some archeologists supposed that it was the floor of an Orthodox church, built some time between the 10th and 11th century. Other experts claim that it was part of the later Catholic monastery on the site because it shows the signs of strong Italianate influence. The monastery was situated at that time in the territory of the Kingdom of Hungary.

==== Renaissance and Baroque ====
Although mosaics went out of fashion and were substituted by frescoes, some of the great Renaissance artists also worked with the old technique. Raphael's Creation of the World in the dome of the Chigi Chapel in Santa Maria del Popolo is a notable example that was executed by a Venetian craftsman, Luigi di Pace.

During the papacy of Clement VIII (1592–1605), the Congregazione della Reverenda Fabbrica di San Pietro was established, providing an independent organisation charged with completing the decorations in the newly built St. Peter's Basilica. Instead of frescoes the cavernous Basilica was mainly decorated with mosaics. Among the explanations are:

1. The old St. Peter's Basilica had been decorated with mosaic, as was common in churches built during the early Christian era; the 17th century followed the tradition to enhance continuity.
2. In a church like this with high walls and few windows, mosaics were brighter and reflected more light.
3. Mosaics had greater intrinsic longevity than either frescoes or canvases.
4. Mosaics had an association with bejeweled decoration, flaunting richness.

The mosaics of St. Peter's often show lively Baroque compositions based on designs or canvases from like Ciro Ferri, Guido Reni, Domenichino, Carlo Maratta, and many others. Raphael is represented by a mosaic replica of this last painting, the Transfiguration. Many different artists contributed to the 17th- and 18th-century mosaics in St. Peter's, including Giovanni Battista Calandra, Fabio Cristofari (died 1689), and Pietro Paolo Cristofari (died 1743). Works of the Fabbrica were often used as papal gifts.

==== The Christian East ====
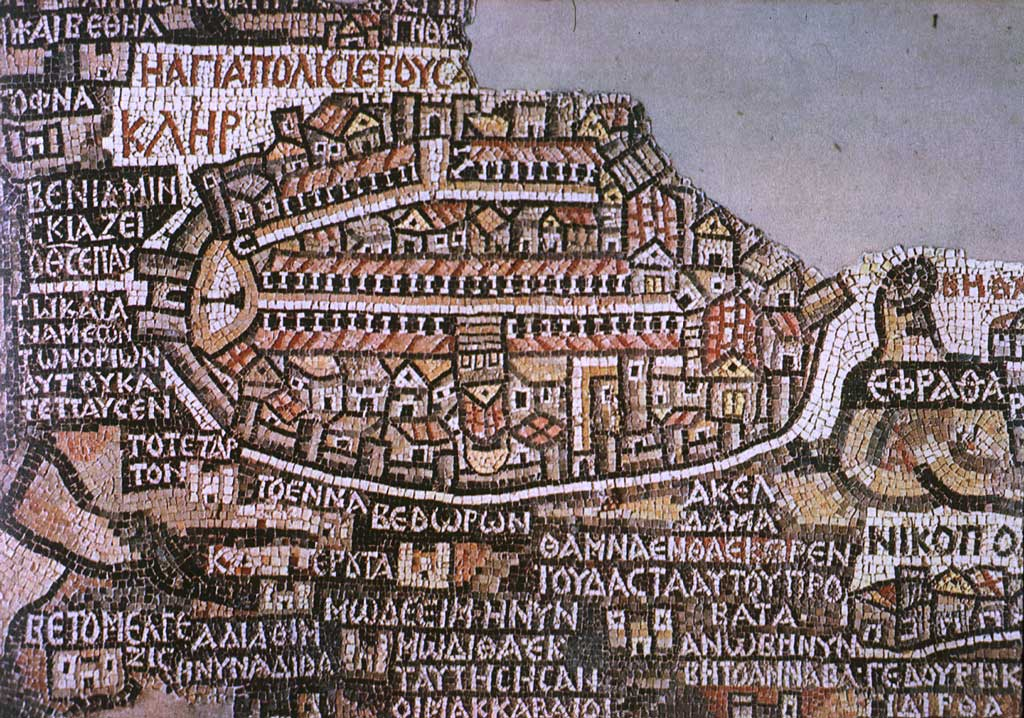
Jerusalem on the Madaba Map

The eastern provinces of the Byzantine Empire inherited a strong artistic tradition from Late Antiquity. Similar to Italy and Constantinople, churches and important secular buildings in the region of Syria and Egypt were decorated with elaborate mosaic panels between the 5th and 8th centuries. The great majority of these works of art were later destroyed, but archeological excavations unearthed many surviving examples.

The single most important piece of Byzantine Christian mosaic art in the East is the Madaba Map, made between 542 and 570 as the floor of the church of Saint George at Madaba, Jordan. It was rediscovered in 1894. The Madaba Map is the oldest surviving cartographic depiction of the Holy Land. It depicts an area from Lebanon in the north to the Nile Delta in the south, and from the Mediterranean Sea in the west to the Eastern Desert. The largest and most detailed element of the topographic depiction is Jerusalem, at the center of the map. The map is enriched with many naturalistic features, like animals, fishing boats, bridges and palm trees.

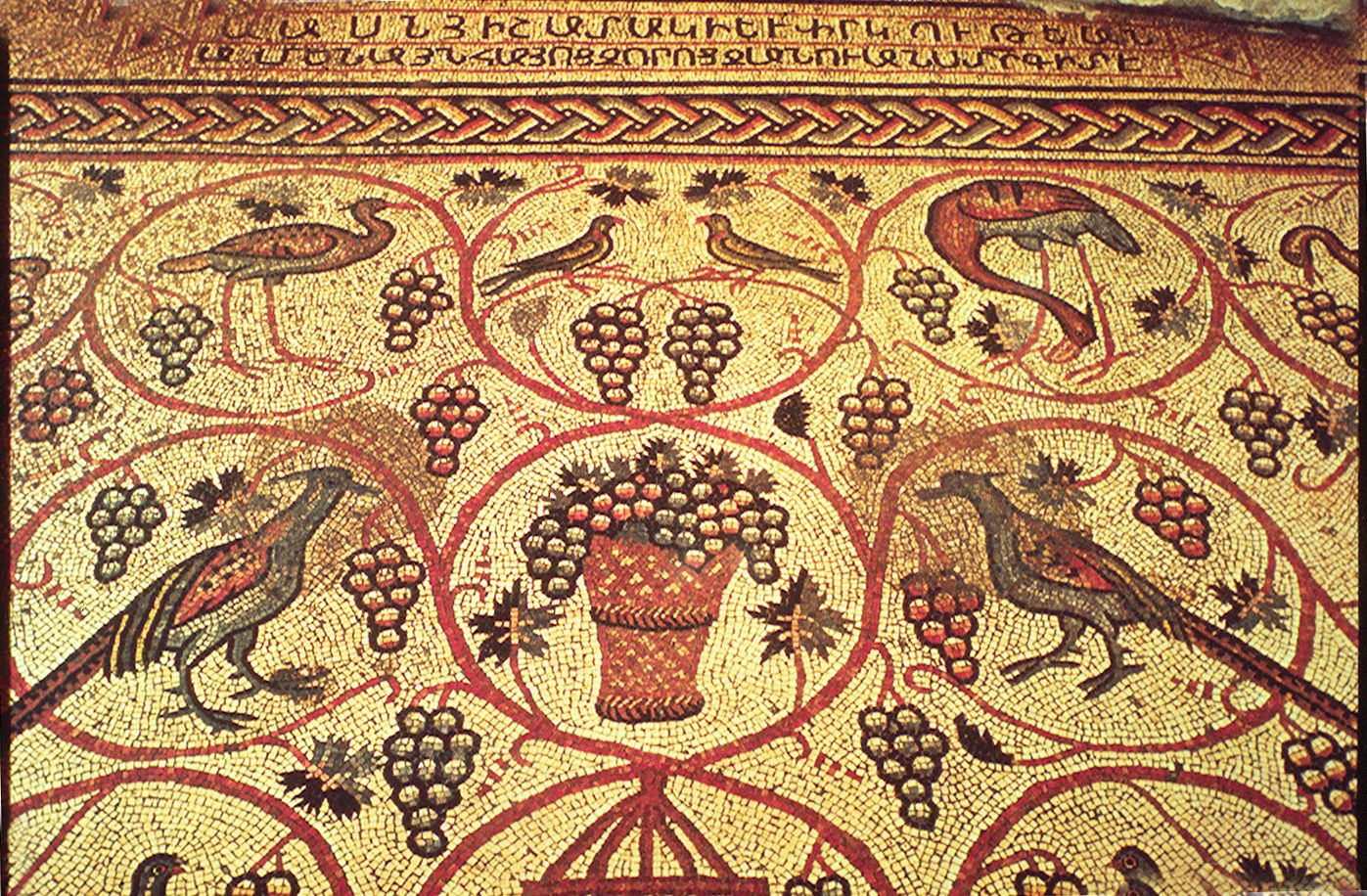
Armenian Mosaic from Jerusalem, dated to the Byzantine period, between the years 450 and 640

One of the earliest examples of Byzantine mosaic art in the region can be found on Mount Nebo, an important place of pilgrimage in the Byzantine era where Moses died. Among the many 6th-century mosaics in the church complex (discovered after 1933) the most interesting one is located in the baptistery. The intact floor mosaic covers an area of 9 × 3 m and was laid down in 530. It depicts hunting and pastoral scenes with rich Middle Eastern flora and fauna.

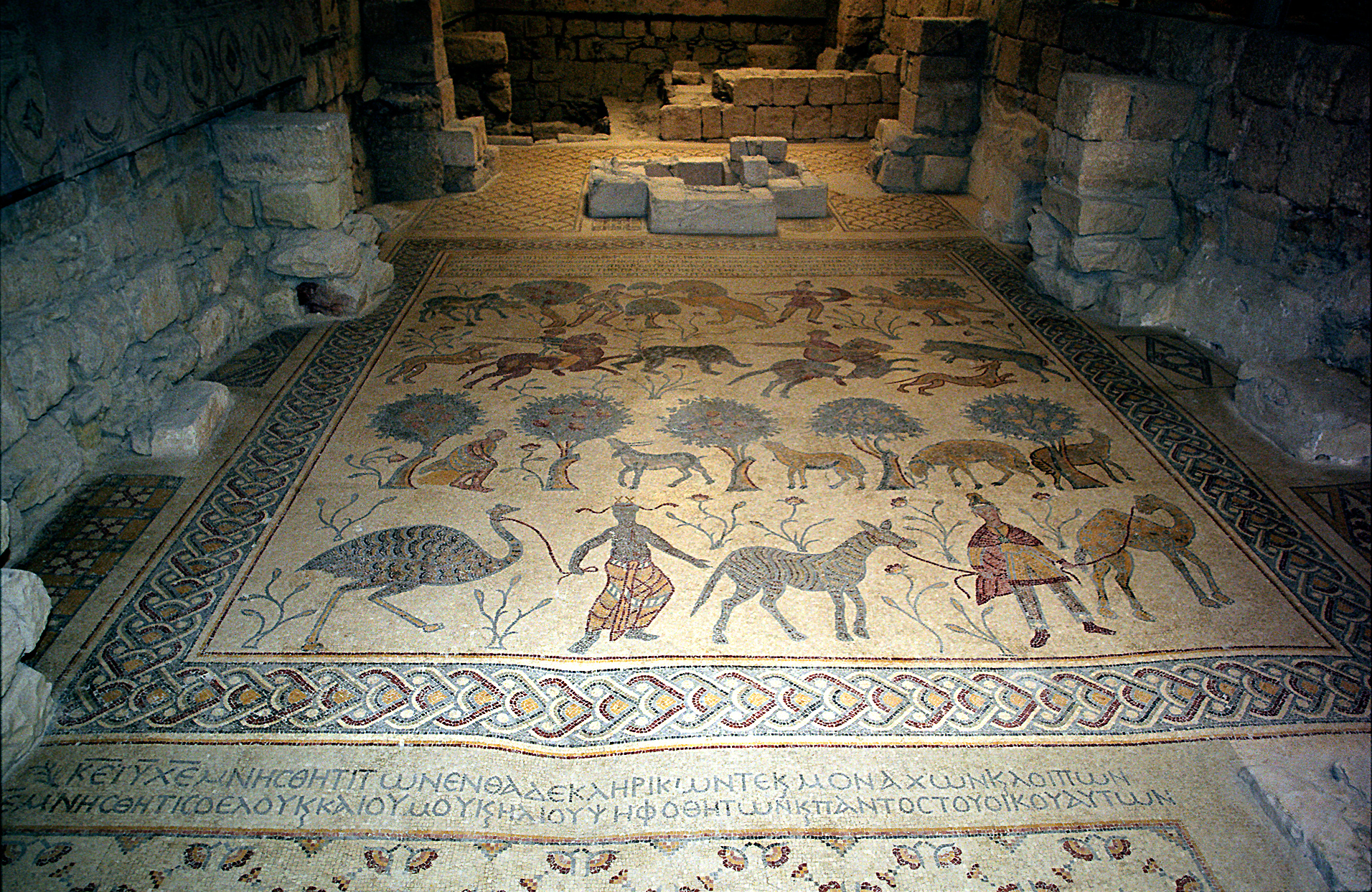
Mosaic floor from the church on Mount Nebo (baptistery, 530)

The Church of Sts. Lot and Procopius was founded in 567 in Nebo village under Mount Nebo (now Khirbet Mukhayyat). Its floor mosaic depicts everyday activities like grape harvest. Another two spectacular mosaics were discovered in the ruined Church of Preacher John nearby. One of the mosaics was placed above the other one which was completely covered and unknown until the modern restoration. The figures on the older mosaic have thus escaped the iconoclasts.

The town of Madaba remained an important center of mosaic making during the 5th–8th centuries. In the Church of the Apostles the middle of the main panel Thalassa, goddess of the sea, can be seen surrounded by fishes and other sea creatures. Native Middle Eastern birds, mammals, plants and fruits were also added.

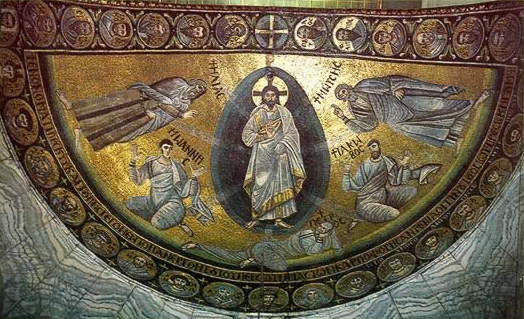
The Transfiguration of Jesus in the Saint Catherine's Monastery

Important Justinian era mosaics decorated the Saint Catherine's Monastery on Mount Sinai in Egypt. Generally wall mosaics have not survived in the region because of the destruction of buildings but the St. Catherine's Monastery is exceptional. On the upper wall Moses is shown in two panels on a landscape background. In the apse we can see the Transfiguration of Jesus on a golden background. The apse is surrounded with bands containing medallions of apostles and prophets, and two contemporary figure, "Abbot Longinos" and "John the Deacon". The mosaic was probably created in 565/6.

Jerusalem with its many holy places probably had the highest concentration of mosaic-covered churches but very few of them survived the subsequent waves of destructions. The present remains do not do justice to the original richness of the city. The most important is the so-called "Armenian Mosaic" which was discovered in 1894 on the Street of the Prophets near Damascus Gate. It depicts a vine with many branches and grape clusters, which springs from a vase. Populating the vine's branches are peacocks, ducks, storks, pigeons, an eagle, a partridge, and a parrot in a cage. The inscription reads: "For the memory and salvation of all those Armenians whose name the Lord knows." Beneath a corner of the mosaic is a small, natural cave which contained human bones dating to the 5th or 6th centuries. The symbolism of the mosaic and the presence of the burial cave indicates that the room was used as a mortuary chapel.

An exceptionally well preserved, carpet-like mosaic floor was uncovered in 1949 in Bethany, the early Byzantine church of the Lazarium which was built between 333 and 390. Because of its purely geometrical pattern, the church floor is to be grouped with other mosaics of the time in Palestine and neighboring areas, especially the Constantinian mosaics in the central nave at Bethlehem. A second church was built above the older one during the 6th century with another more simple geometric mosaic floor.

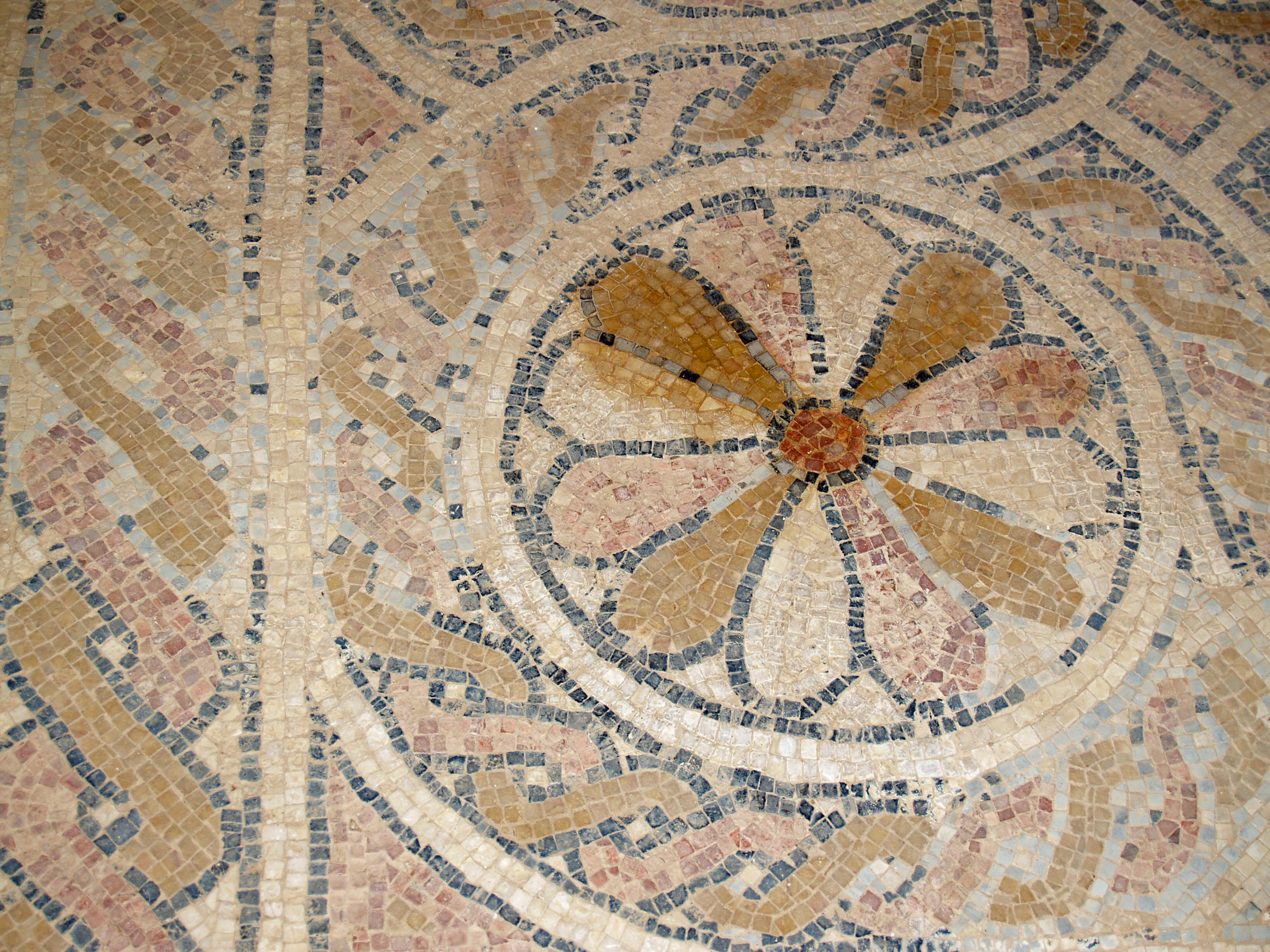
Detail from the mosaic floor of the Byzantine church of in Masada. The monastic community lived here in the 5th–7th centuries.

The monastic communities of the Judean Desert also decorated their monasteries with mosaic floors. The Monastery of Martyrius was founded in the end of the 5th century and it was re-discovered in 1982–85. The most important work of art here is the intact geometric mosaic floor of the refectory although the severely damaged church floor was similarly rich. The mosaics in the church of the nearby Monastery of Euthymius are of later date (discovered in 1930). They were laid down in the Umayyad era, after a devastating earthquake in 659. Two six pointed stars and a red chalice are the most important surviving features.

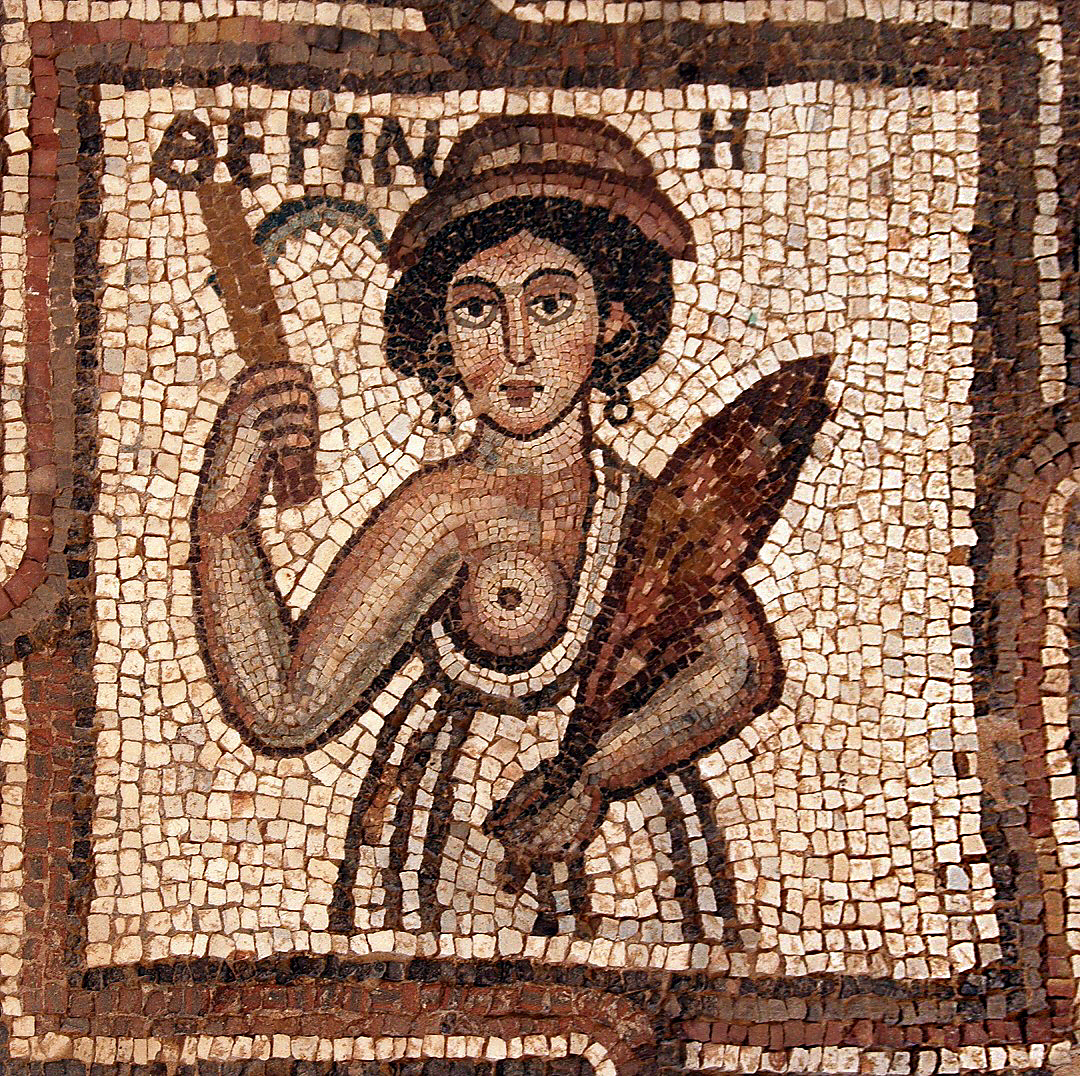
Detail from the mosaic floor of the Petra Church

Mosaic art also flourished in Christian Petra where three Byzantine churches were discovered. The most important one was uncovered in 1990. It is known that the walls were also covered with golden glass mosaics but only the floor panels survived as usual. The mosaic of the seasons in the southern aisle is from this first building period from the middle of the 5th century. In the first half of the 6th century the mosaics of the northern aisle and the eastern end of the southern aisle were installed. They depict native as well as exotic or mythological animals, and personifications of the Seasons, Ocean, Earth and Wisdom.

The Arab conquest of the Middle East in the 7th century did not break off the art of mosaic making. Arabs learned and accepted the craft as their own and carried on the classical tradition. During the Umayyad era Christianity retained its importance, churches were built and repaired and some of the most important mosaics of the Christian East were made during the 8th century when the region was under Islamic rule.

The mosaics of the Church of St Stephen in ancient Kastron Mefaa (now Umm ar-Rasas) were made in 785 (discovered after 1986). The perfectly preserved mosaic floor is the largest one in Jordan. On the central panel hunting and fishing scenes are depicted while another panel illustrates the most important cities of the region. The frame of the mosaic is especially decorative. Six mosaic masters signed the work: Staurachios from Esbus, Euremios, Elias, Constantinus, Germanus and Abdela. It overlays another, damaged, mosaic floor of the earlier (587) "Church of Bishop Sergius". Another four churches were excavated nearby with traces of mosaic decoration.

The last great mosaics in Madaba were made in 767 in the Church of the Virgin Mary (discovered in 1887). It is a masterpiece of the geometric style with a Greek inscription in the central medallion.

With the fall of the Umayyad dynasty in 750 the Middle East went through deep cultural changes. No great mosaics were made after the end of the 8th century and the majority of churches gradually fell into disrepair and were eventually destroyed. The tradition of mosaic making died out among the Christians and also in the Islamic community.

==== Orthodox countries ====
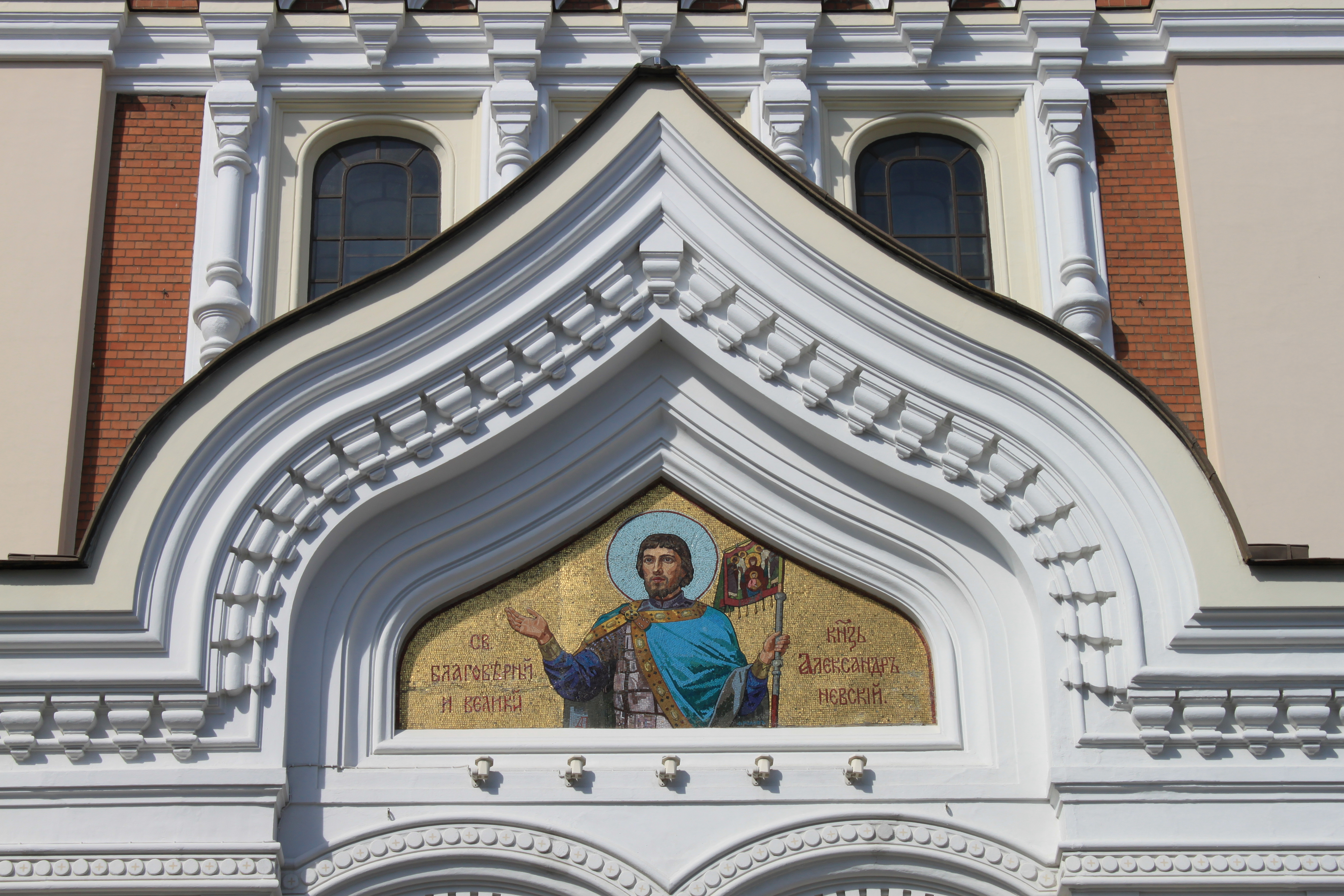
Mosaic on the pediment of the Alexander Nevsky Cathedral in Tallinn, Estonia

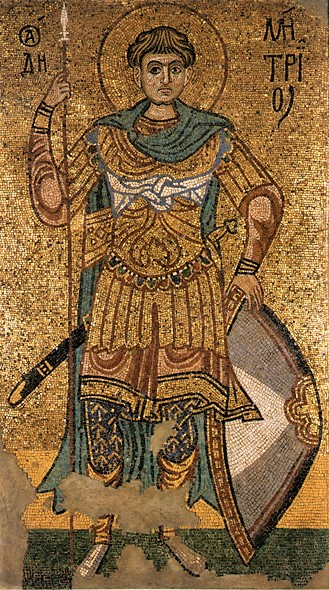
Early 12th-century Kyivan mosaic depicting St. Demetrius.

The craft has also been popular in early medieval Rus, inherited as part of the Byzantine tradition. Yaroslav, the Grand Prince of the Kievan Rus' built a large cathedral in his capital, Kyiv. The model of the church was the Hagia Sophia in Constantinople, and it was also called Saint Sophia Cathedral. It was built mainly by Byzantine master craftsmen, sent by Constantine Monomachos, between 1037 and 1046. Naturally the more important surfaces in the interior were decorated with golden mosaics. In the dome we can see the traditional stern Pantokrator supported by angels. Between the 12 windows of the drum were apostles and the four evangelists on the pendentives. The apse is dominated by an orant Theotokos with a Deesis in three medallions above. Below is a Communion of the Apostles.

Prince Sviatopolk II built St. Michael's Golden-Domed Monastery in Kyiv in 1108. The mosaics of the church are undoubtedly works of Byzantine artists. Although the church was destroyed by Soviet authorities, majority of the panels were preserved. Small parts of ornamental mosaic decoration from the 12th century survived in the Saint Sophia Cathedral in Novgorod but this church was largely decorated with frescoes.

Using mosaics and frescoes in the same building was a unique practice in Ukraine. Harmony was achieved by using the same dominant colors in mosaic and fresco. Both Saint Sophia Cathedral and Saint Michael's Golden-Domed Monastery in Kyiv use this technique. Mosaics stopped being used for church decoration as early as the 12th century in the eastern Slavic countries. Later Russian churches were decorated with frescoes, similarly then orthodox churches in the Balkan.

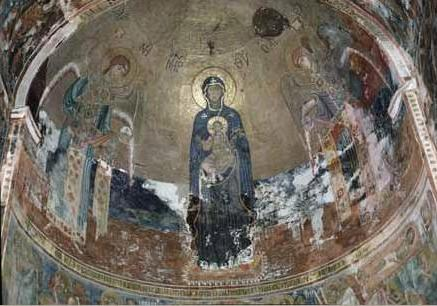
Apse mosaic "Glory of the Theotokos" in Gelati, Georgia. c. 1125–1130.

The apse mosaic of the Gelati Monastery is a rare example of mosaic use in Georgia. Began by king David IV and completed by his son Demetrius I of Georgia, the fragmentary panel depicts Theotokos flanked by two archangels. The use of mosaic in Gelati attests to some Byzantine influence in the country and was a demonstration of the imperial ambition of the Bagrationids. The mosaic covered church could compete in magnificence with the churches of Constantinople. Gelati is one of few mosaic creations which survived in Georgia but fragments prove that the early churches of Pitsunda and Tsromi were also decorated with mosaic as well as other, lesser known sites. The destroyed 6th century mosaic floors in the Pitsunda Cathedral have been inspired by Roman prototypes. In Tsromi the tesserae are still visible on the walls of the 7th-century church but only faint lines hint at the original scheme. Its central figure was Christ standing and displaying a scroll with Georgian text.

=== Jewish mosaics ===
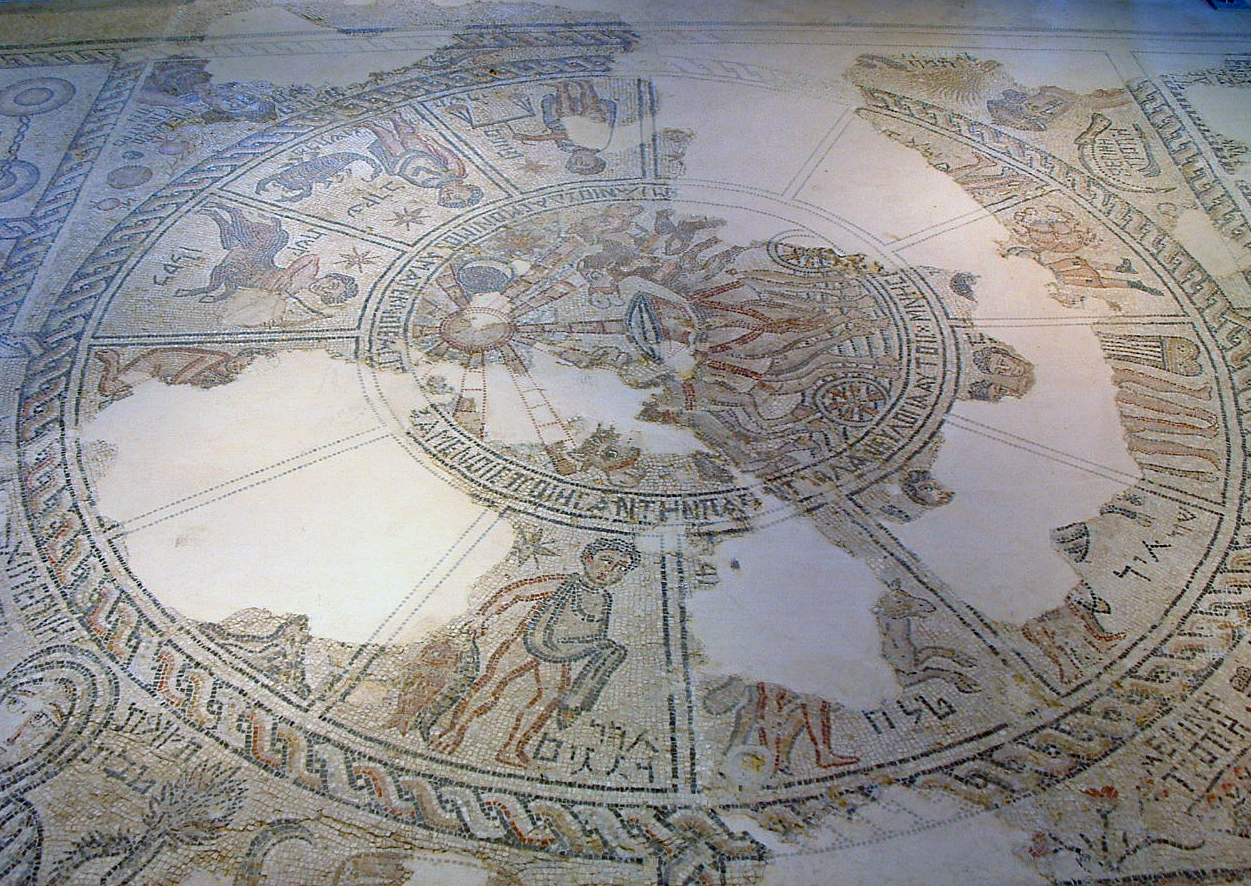
Zodiac wheel on the floor of the synagogue in Sepphoris

Under Roman and Byzantine influence the Jews also decorated their synagogues with classical floor mosaics. Many interesting examples were discovered in Galilee and the Judean Desert.

The remains of a 6th-century synagogue have been uncovered in Sepphoris, which was an important centre of Jewish culture between the 3rd–7th centuries and a multicultural town inhabited by Jews, Christians and pagans. The mosaic reflects an interesting fusion of Jewish and pagan beliefs. In the center of the floor the zodiac wheel was depicted. Helios sits in the middle, in his sun chariot, and each zodiac is matched with a Jewish month. Along the sides of the mosaic are strips depicting Biblical scenes, such as the binding of Isaac, as well as traditional rituals, including a burnt sacrifice and the offering of fruits and grains.

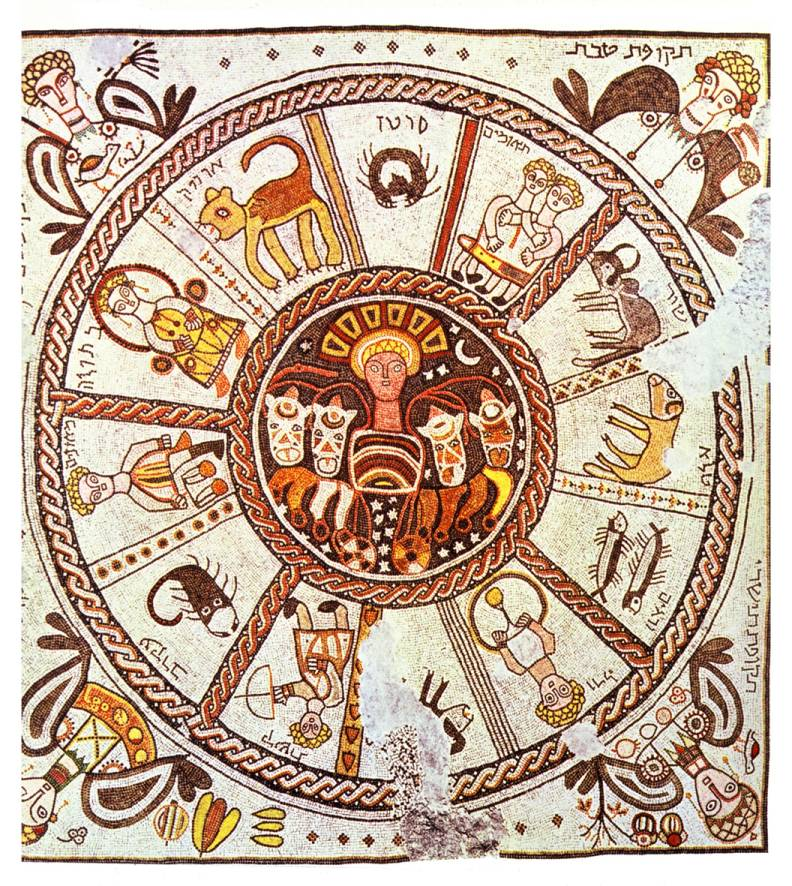
Another example of a Zodiac wheel on the floor of the synagogue, this time in Beit Alfa.

Another zodiac mosaic decorated the floor of the Beit Alfa synagogue which was built during the reign of Justin I (518–27). It is regarded one of the most important mosaics discovered in Israel. Each of its three panels depicts a scene – the Holy Ark, the zodiac, and the story of the sacrifice of Isaac. In the center of the zodiac is Helios, the sun god, in his chariot. The four women in the corners of the mosaic represent the four seasons.

A third superbly preserved zodiac mosaic was discovered in the Severus synagogue in the ancient resort town of Hammat Tiberias. In the center of the 4th-century mosaic the Sun god, Helios sits in his chariot holding the celestial sphere and a whip. Nine of the 12 signs of the zodiac survived intact. Another panel shows the Ark of Covenant and Jewish cultic objects used in the Temple at Jerusalem.

In 1936, a synagogue was excavated in Jericho which was named Shalom Al Yisrael Synagogue after an inscription on its mosaic floor ("Peace on Israel"). It appears to have been in use from the 5th to 8th centuries and contained a big mosaic on the floor with drawings of the Ark of the Covenant, the Menorah, a Shofar and a Lulav. Nearby in Naaran, there is another synagogue (discovered in 1918) from the 6th century that also has a mosaic floor.

The synagogue in Eshtemoa (As-Samu) was built around the 4th century. The mosaic floor is decorated with only floral and geometric patterns. The synagogue in Khirbet Susiya (excavated in 1971–72, founded in the end of the 4th century) has three mosaic panels, the eastern one depicting a Torah shrine, two menorahs, a lulav and an etrog with columns, deer and rams. The central panel is geometric while the western one is seriously damaged but it has been suggested that it depicted Daniel in the lion's den. The Roman synagogue in Ein Gedi was remodeled in the Byzantine era and a more elaborate mosaic floor was laid down above the older white panels. The usual geometric design was enriched with birds in the center. It includes the names of the signs of the zodiac and important figures from the Jewish past but not their images suggesting that it served a rather conservative community.

The ban on figurative depiction was not taken so seriously by the Jews living in Byzantine Gaza. In 1966 remains of a synagogue were found in the ancient harbour area. Its mosaic floor depicts King David as Orpheus, identified by his name in Hebrew letters. Near him were lion cubs, a giraffe and a snake listening to him playing a lyre. A further portion of the floor was divided by medallions formed by vine leaves, each of which contains an animal: a lioness suckling her cub, a giraffe, peacocks, panthers, bears, a zebra and so on. The floor was paved in 508/509. It is very similar to that of the synagogue at Maon (Menois) and the Christian church at Shellal, suggesting that the same artist most probably worked at all three places.

The House of Leontius in Bet She'an (excavated in 1964–72) is a rare example of a synagogue which was part of an inn. It was built in the Byzantine period. The colorful mosaic floor of the synagogue room had an outer stripe decorated with flowers and birds, around medallions with animals, created by vine trellises emerging from an amphora. The central medallion enclosed a menorah (candelabrum) beneath the word shalom (peace).

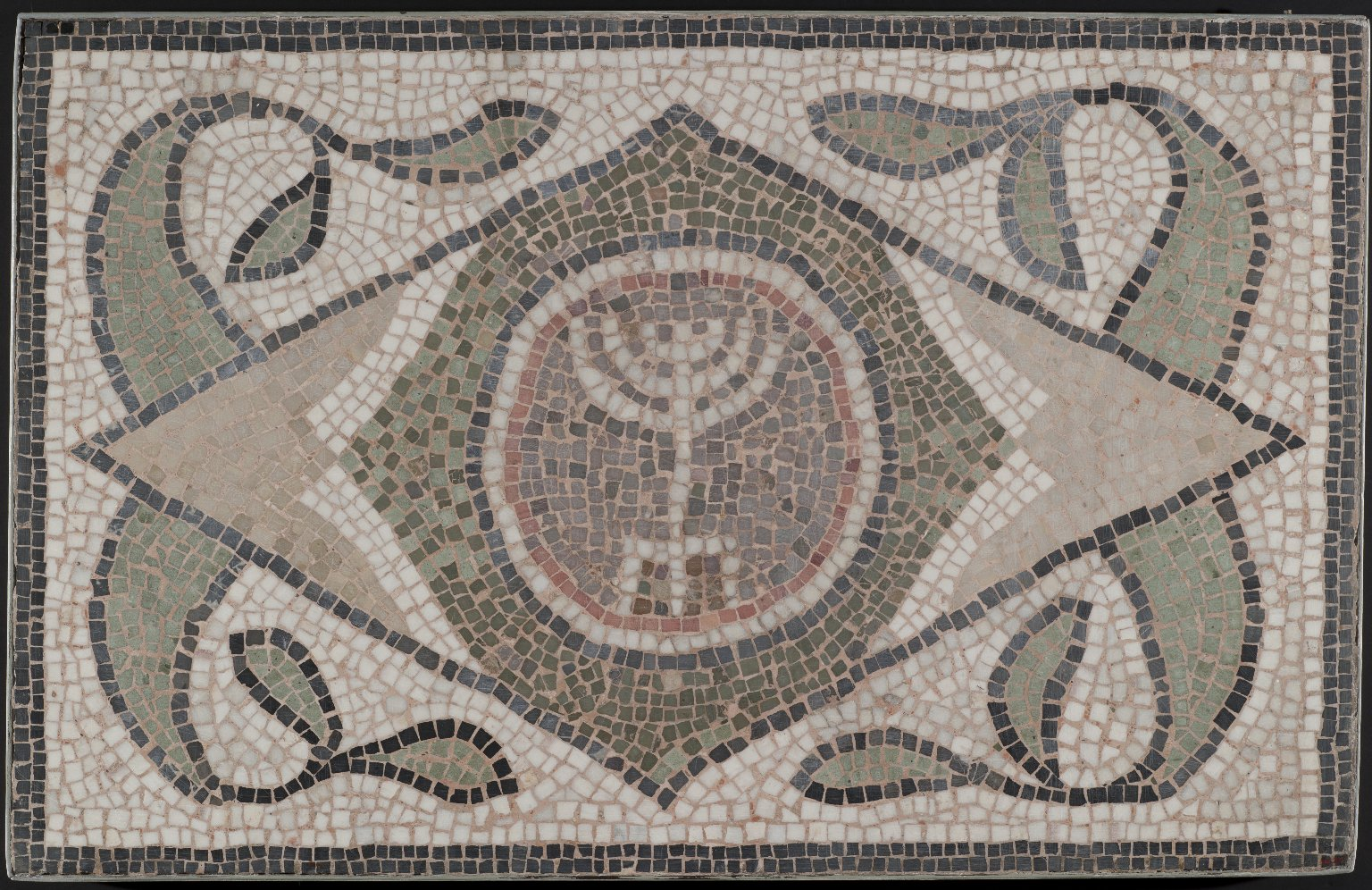
Mosaic of Menorah from Hammam Lif synagogue, Tunisia, 6th c. Brooklyn Museum

A 5th-century building in Huldah may be a Samaritan synagogue. Its mosaic floor contains typical Jewish symbols (menorah, lulav, etrog) but the inscriptions are Greek. Another Samaritan synagogue with a mosaic floor was located in Bet She'an (excavated in 1960). The floor had only decorative motifs and an aedicule (shrine) with cultic symbols. The ban on human or animal images was more strictly observed by the Samaritans than their Jewish neighbours in the same town (see above). The mosaic was laid by the same masters who made the floor of the Beit Alfa synagogue. One of the inscriptions was written in Samaritan script.

In 2003, a synagogue of the 5th or 6th century was uncovered in the coastal Ionian town of Saranda, Albania. It had exceptional mosaics depicting items associated with Jewish holidays, including a menorah, ram's horn, and lemon tree. Mosaics in the basilica of the synagogue show the facade of what resembles a Torah, animals, trees, and other biblical symbols. The structure measures 20 by 24 m. and was probably last used in the 6th century as a church.

=== Arabic mosaics ===
In South Arabia two mosaic works were excavated in a Qatabanian from the late 3rd century, those two plates formed geometric and grapevines formation reflecting the traditions of that culture. In the Ghassanid era religious mosaic art flourished in their territory, so far five churches with mosaic were recorded from that era, two built by Ghassanid rulers and the other three by the Christian Arab community who wrote their names and dedications.

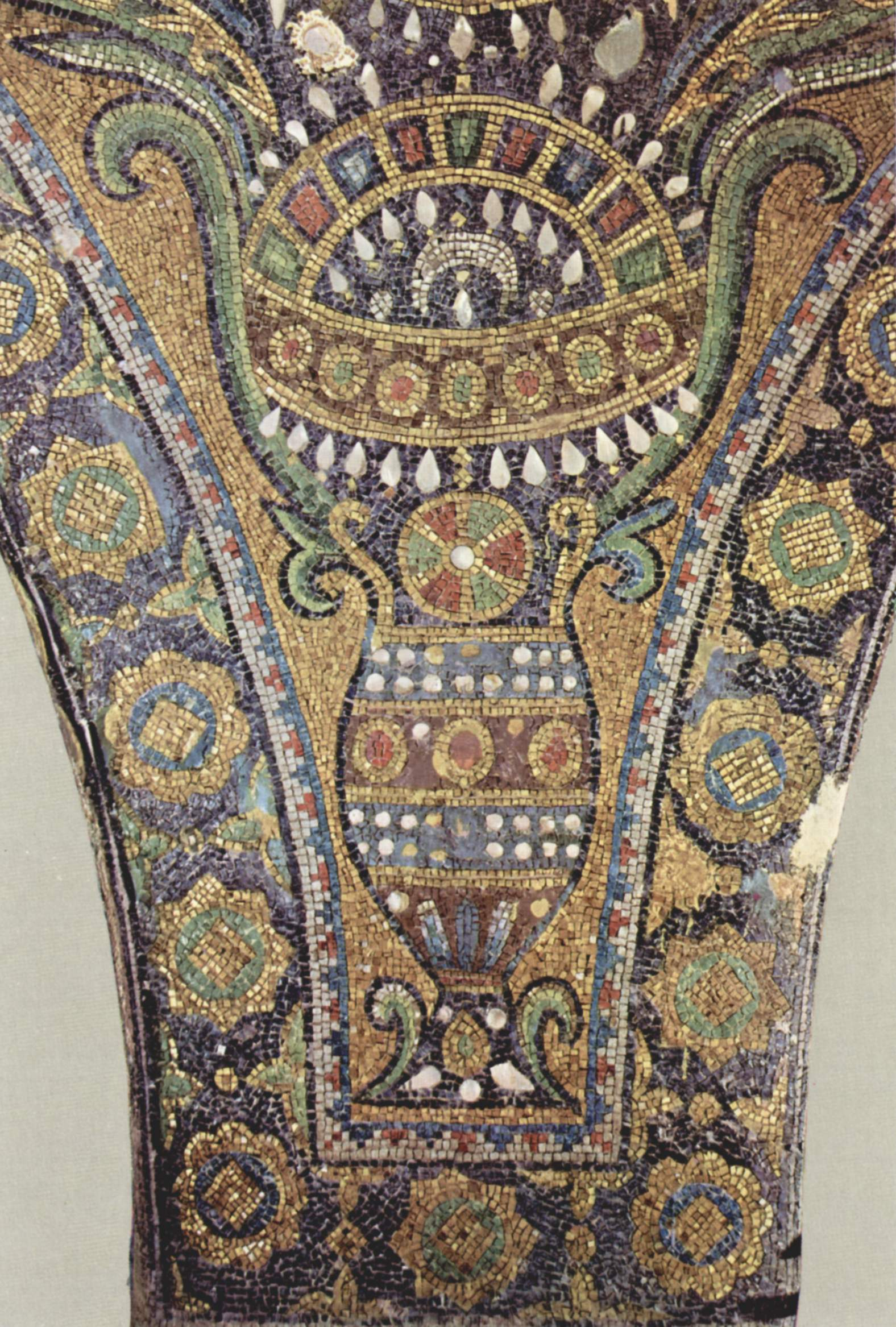
Islamic mosaics inside the Dome of the Rock in Palestine (c. 690)

Islamic architecture used mosaic technique to decorate religious buildings and palaces after the Muslim conquests. During the Umayyad Dynasty mosaic making remained a flourishing art form in Islamic culture and it is continued in the art of zellige and azulejo in various parts of the Arab world, although tile was to become the main Islamic form of wall decoration.

The first great religious building of Islam, the Dome of the Rock in Jerusalem, which was built between 688 and 692, was decorated with glass mosaics both inside and outside, by craftsmen of the Byzantine tradition. Only parts of the original interior decoration survive. The rich floral motifs follow Byzantine traditions, and are "Islamic only in the sense that the vocabulary is syncretic and does not include representation of men or animals".

The most important early Islamic mosaic work is the decoration of the Umayyad Mosque in Damascus, then capital of the Muslim Caliphate. The mosque was built between 706 and 715. The mosaics of the inner courtyard depict Paradise with beautiful trees, flowers and small hill towns and villages in the background. The mosaics include no human figures, which makes them different from the otherwise similar contemporary Byzantine works. The biggest continuous section survives under the western arcade of the courtyard, called the "Barada Panel" after the river Barada. It is thought that the mosque used to have the largest gold mosaic in the world, at over 4 m^{2}. In 1893 a fire damaged the mosque extensively, and many mosaics were lost, although some have been restored since.

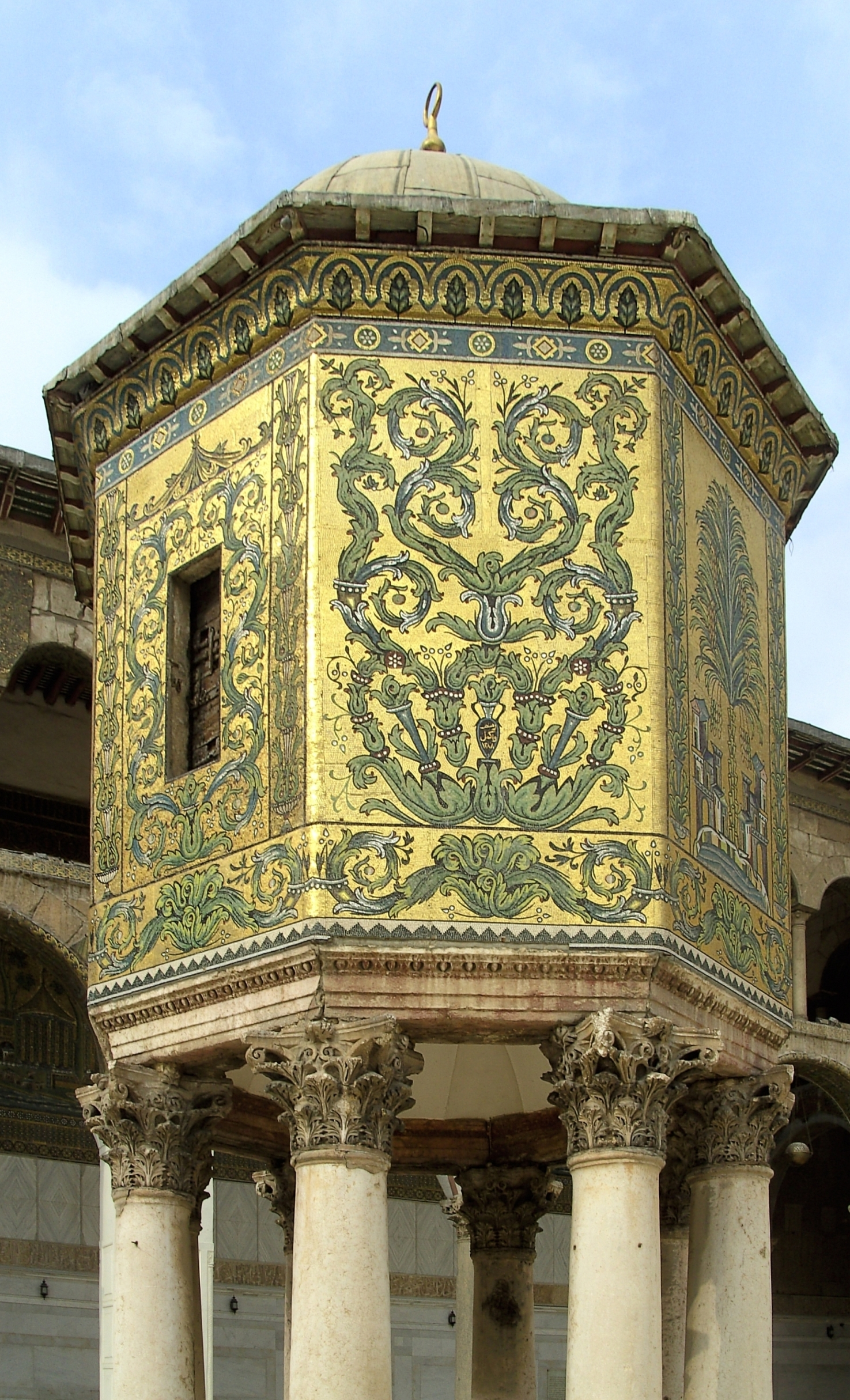
Qubbat al-Khazna built by the Abbasid governor, Fadl ibn Salih, in 789, in the Umayyad Mosque

The mosaics of the Umayyad Mosque gave inspiration to later Damascene mosaic works. The Dome of the Treasury, which stands in the mosque courtyard, is covered with fine mosaics, probably dating from 13th- or 14th-century restoration work. The style of them are strikingly similar to the Barada Panel. The mausoleum of Sultan Baibars, Madrassa Zahiriyah, which was built after 1277, is also decorated with a band of golden floral and architectural mosaics, running around inside the main prayer hall.

Non-religious Umayyad mosaic works were mainly floor panels which decorated the palaces of the caliphs and other high-ranking officials. They were closely modeled after the mosaics of the Roman country villas, once common in the Eastern Mediterranean. The most superb example can be found in the bath house of Hisham's Palace, Palestine which was made around 744. The main panel depicts a large tree and underneath it a lion attacking a deer (right side) and two deer peacefully grazing (left side). The panel probably represents good and bad governance. Mosaics with classical geometric motifs survived in the bath area of the 8th-century Umayyad palace complex in Anjar, Lebanon. The luxurious desert residence of Al-Walid II in Qasr al-Hallabat (in present-day Jordan) was also decorated with floor mosaics that show a high level of technical skill. The best preserved panel at Hallabat is divided by a Tree of Life flanked by "good" animals on one side and "bad" animals on the other. Among the Hallabat representations are vine scrolls, grapes, pomegranates, oryx, wolves, hares, a leopard, pairs of partridges, fish, bulls, ostriches, rabbits, rams, goats, lions and a snake. At Qastal, near Amman, excavations in 2000 uncovered the earliest known Umayyad mosaics in present-day Jordan, dating probably from the caliphate of Abd al-Malik ibn Marwan (685–705). They cover much of the floor of a finely decorated building that probably served as the palace of a local governor. The Qastal mosaics depict geometrical patterns, trees, animals, fruits and rosettes. Except for the open courtyard, entrance and staircases, the floors of the entire palace were covered in mosaics.

Umayyad Mosaics

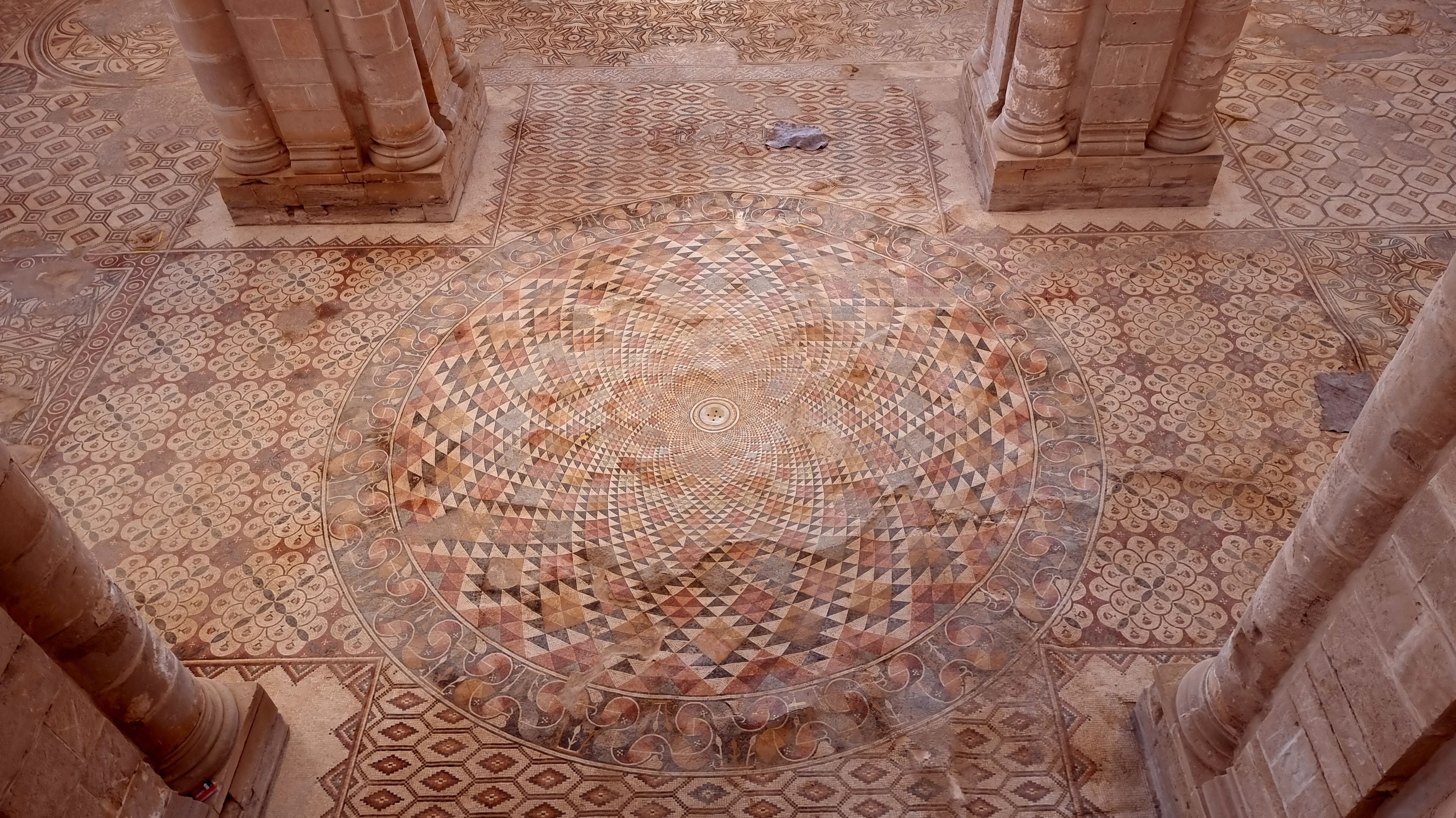
Mosaic of Hisham's Palace, in Palestine, closely followed classical traditions (8th century)

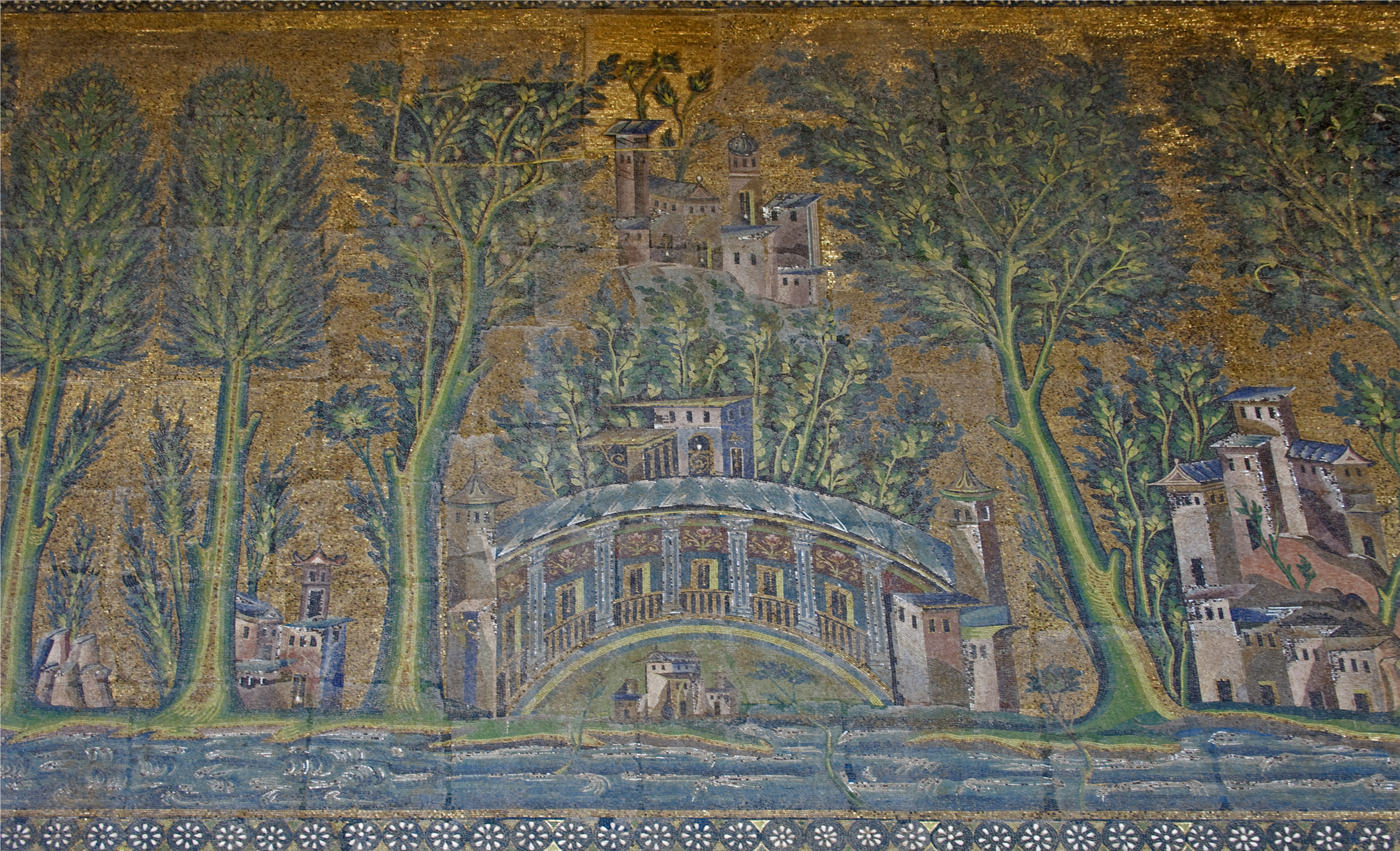
Portion of the so-called "Barada Panel" in the Umayyad Mosque, in Syria (8th century)

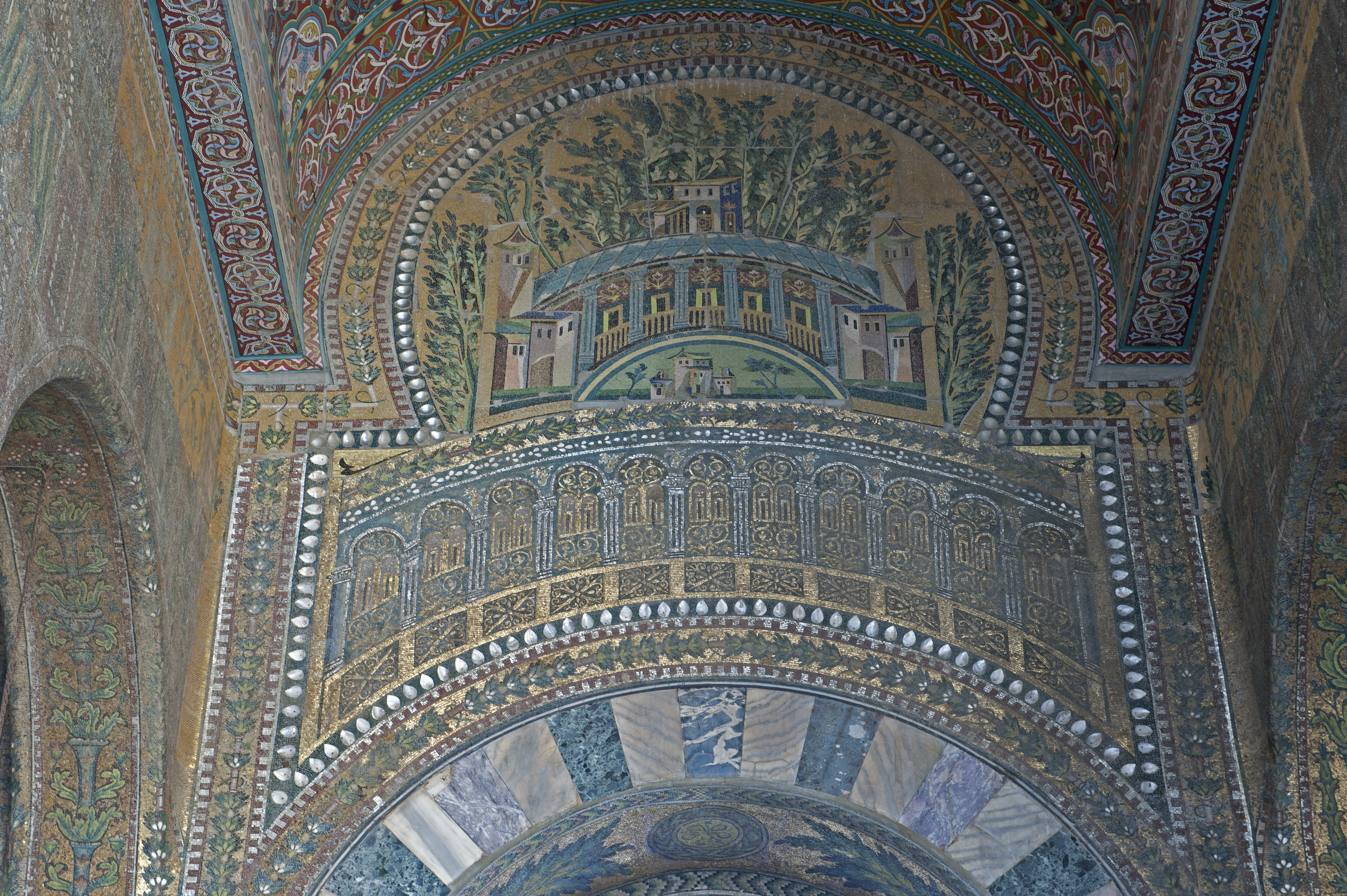
Mosaics above the entrance area in the Umayyad Mosque

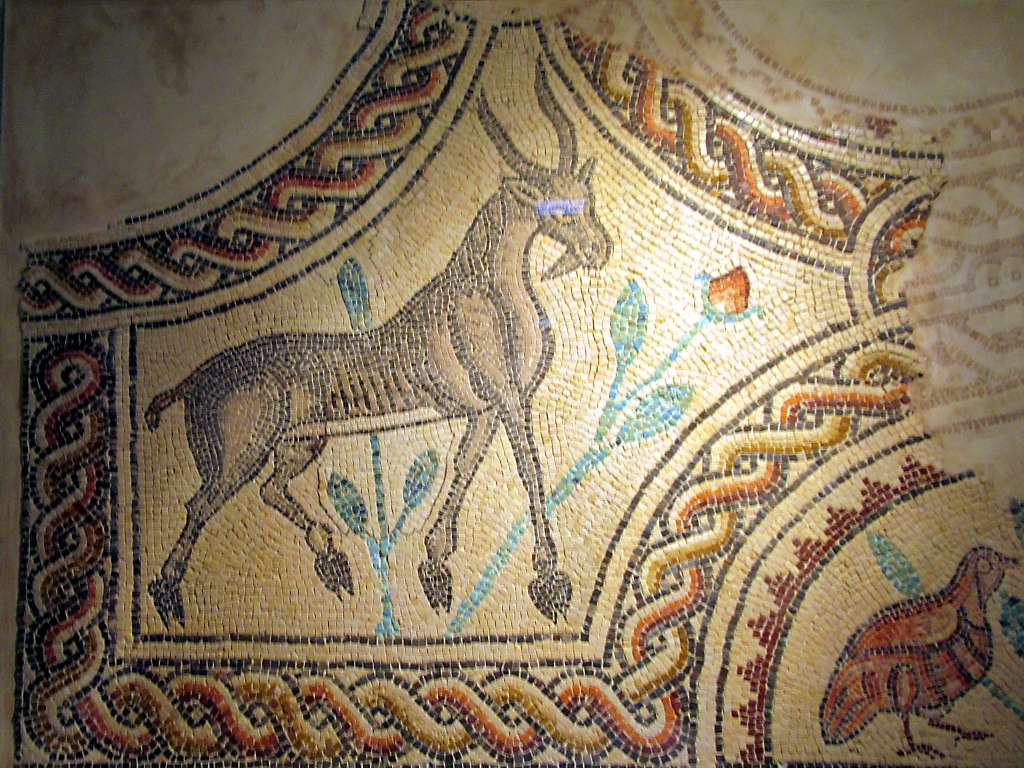
A gazelle mosaic in Hammam al-Sarah, in Jordan

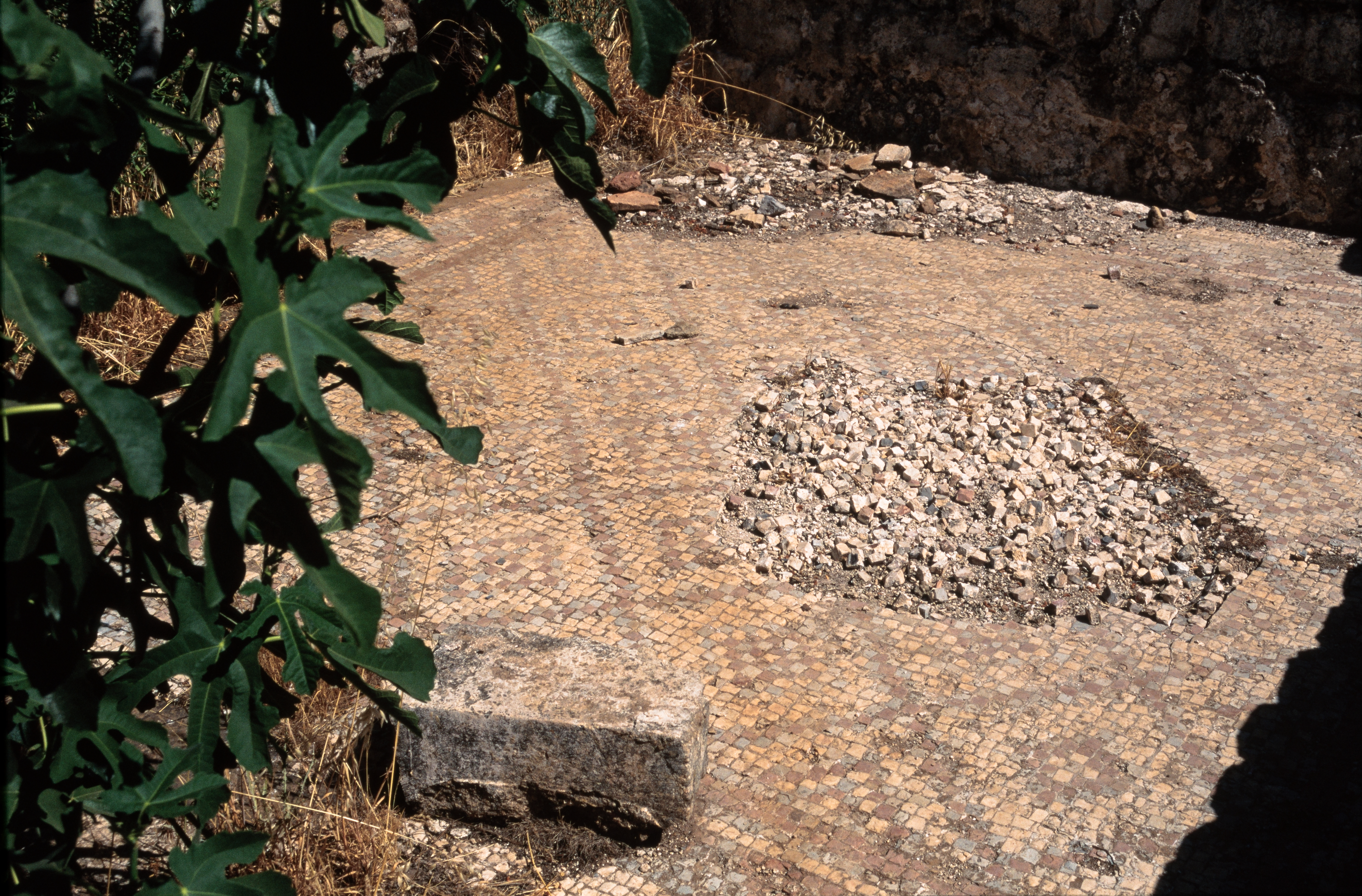
Remenants of floor mosaics in the Umayyad city of Anjar, in Lebanon (8th century)

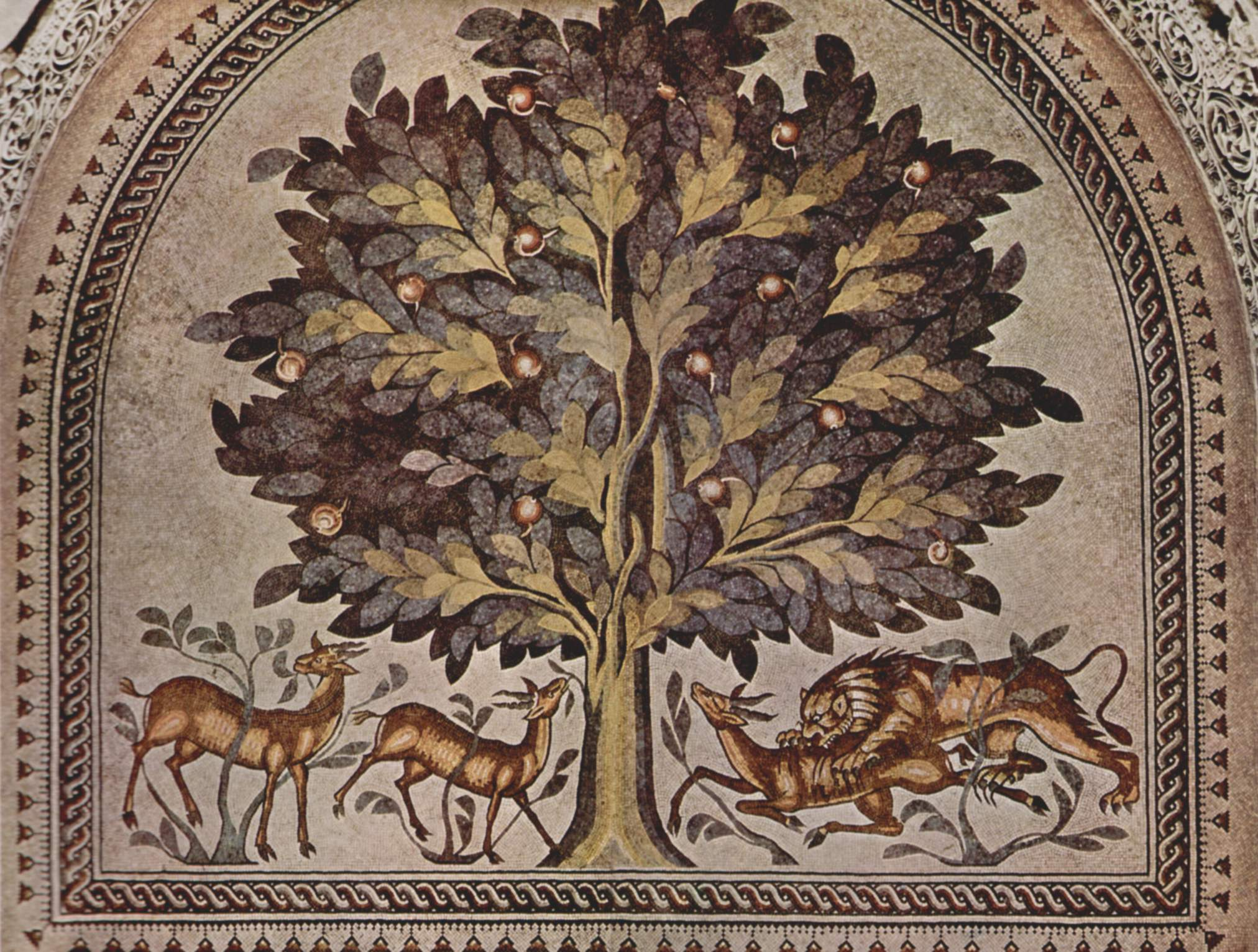
Tree of Life mosaic from the audience room of the bathhouse at Hisham's Palace near Jericho

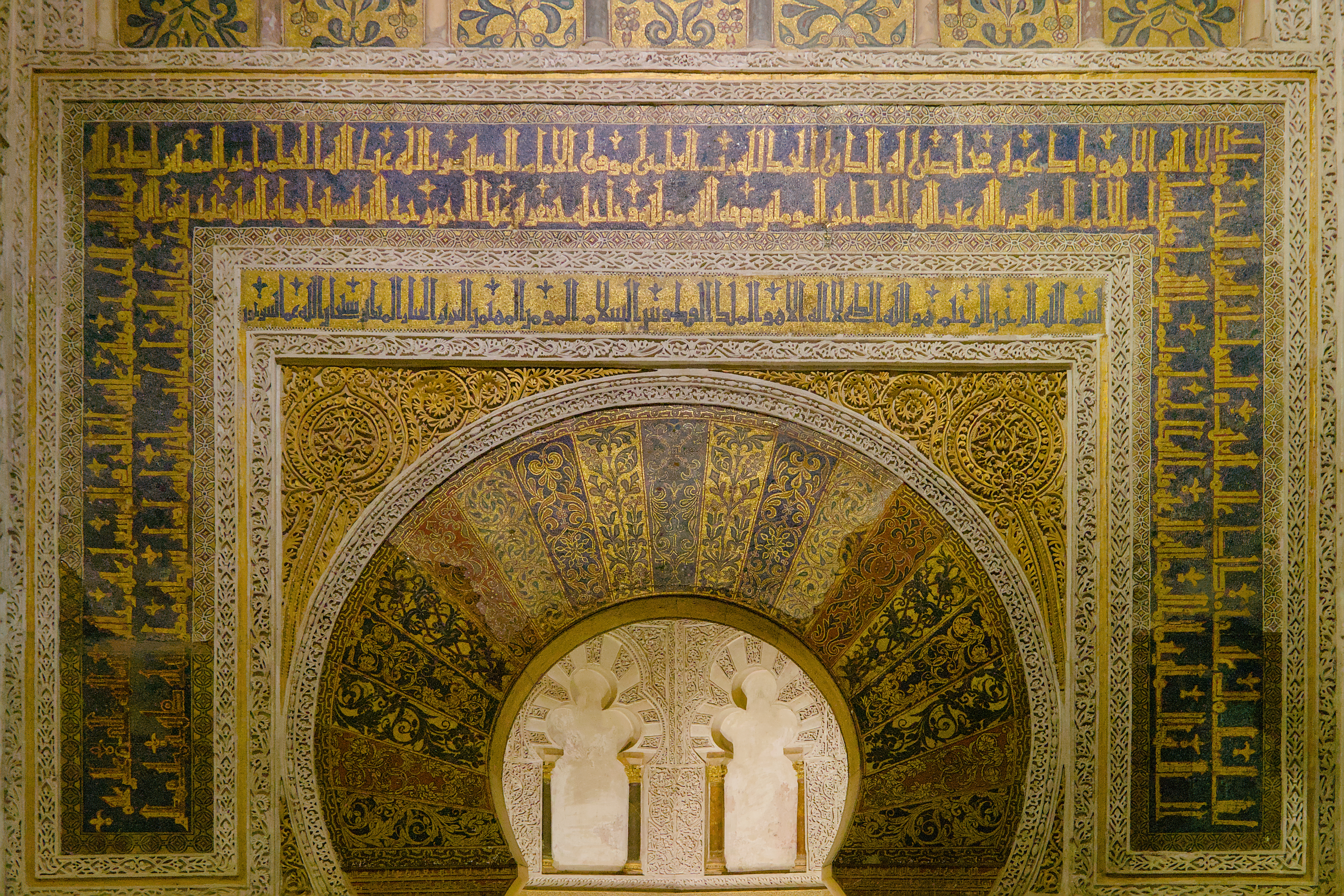
Mosaics in the mihrab of the Great Mosque in Corduba, Spain (965–970)

Some of the best examples of later Islamic mosaics were produced in the Umayyad state of Córdoba (modern day Spain and Portugal) are the golden mosaics in the mihrab and the central dome of the maqsura in the Great Mosque in Córdoba which have a decidedly Byzantine character. They were made between 965 and 970 by local craftsmen, supervised by a master mosaicist from Constantinople, who was sent by the Byzantine Emperor to the Umayyad Caliph of Spain. The decoration is composed of colorful floral arabesques and wide bands of Arab calligraphy. The mosaics were purported to evoke the glamour of the Great Umayyad Mosque in Damascus, which was lost for the Umayyad family.

Mosaics generally went out of fashion in the Islamic world after the 8th century, although Umayyad-style mosaics can be found in later periods for example in the 11th-century Fatimid reconstruction of the Qibli (Al-Aqsa) Mosque in Al-Aqsa Compound.

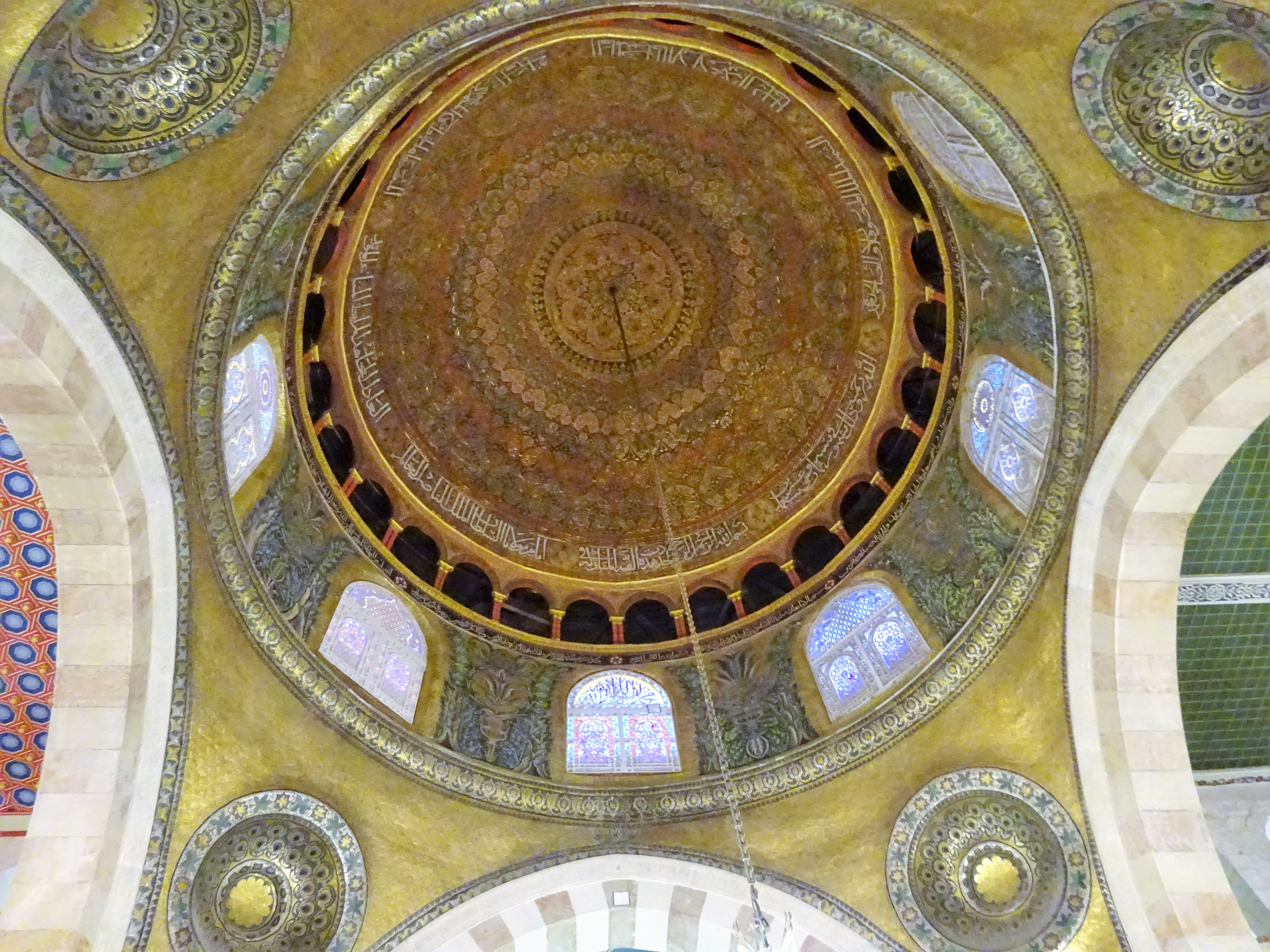
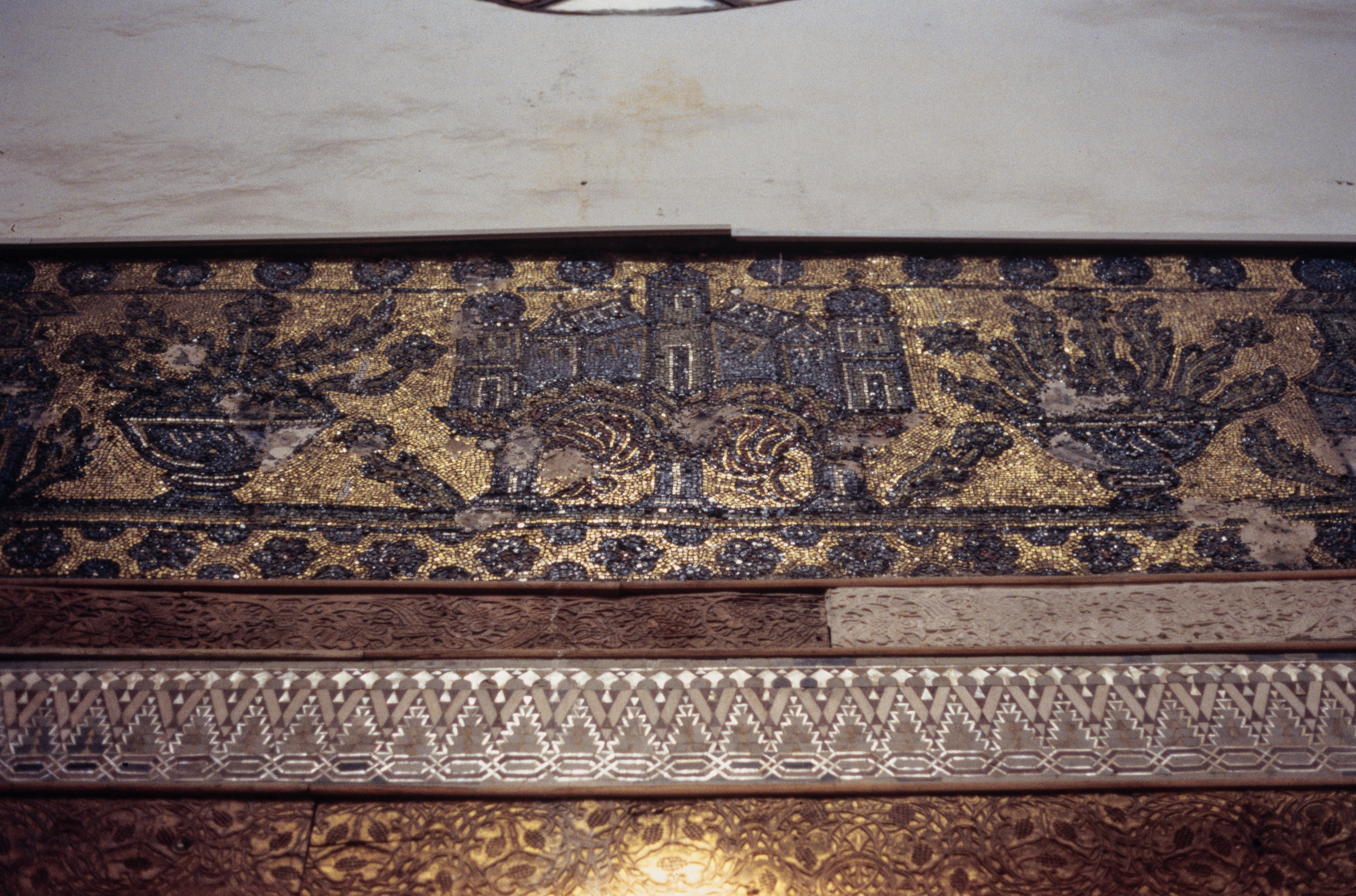
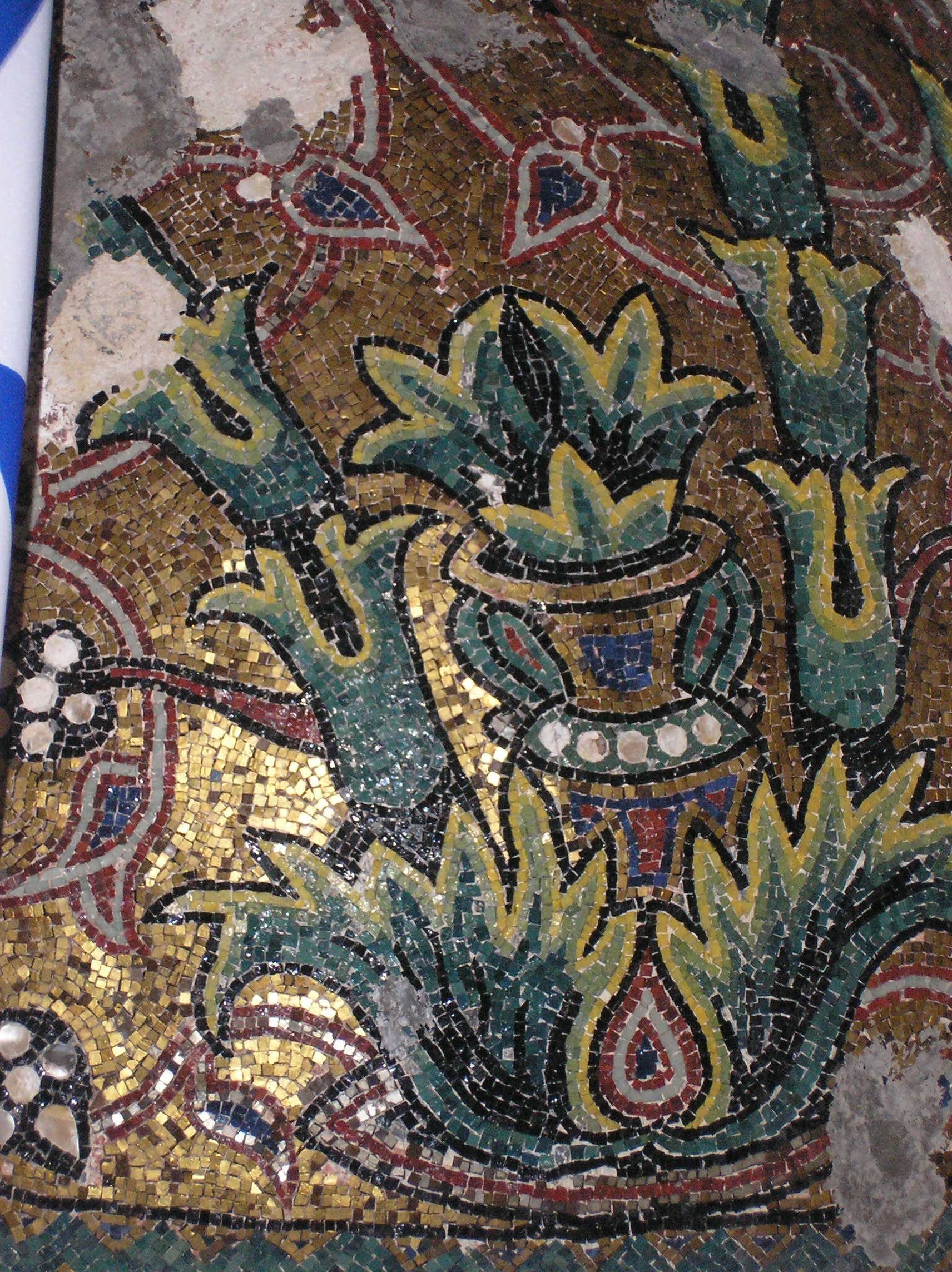
Umayyad-style mosaics in the Qibli (Al-Aqsa) Mosque (left), the Zahiriyya Library (middle), and the Tankiziyya Madrasa (right)

Other examples of mosaic decoration in the Islamic Arab world include the mihrab of the Ayyubid Mausoleum of Shajar al-Durr (1250) and the mihrab of the madrasa within the Qalawun Complex (1285), both in Cairo; the walls of the Zahiriyya Library (1281) and the mihrab of the adjoining mausoleum of the Tankiz Mosque (1318), both in Damascus; the mihrab of the Tankiziyya Madarasa (1330) in Jerusalem; and the mihrab of the Al-Burtasi Mosque (1324) in Tripoli. Similar effects of mosaics were achieved by the use of painted tilework, either geometric with small tiles, sometimes called mosaic, like the zillij of North Africa, or larger tiles painted with parts of a large decorative scheme (Qashani) in Persia, Turkey and further east.

== Modern mosaics ==
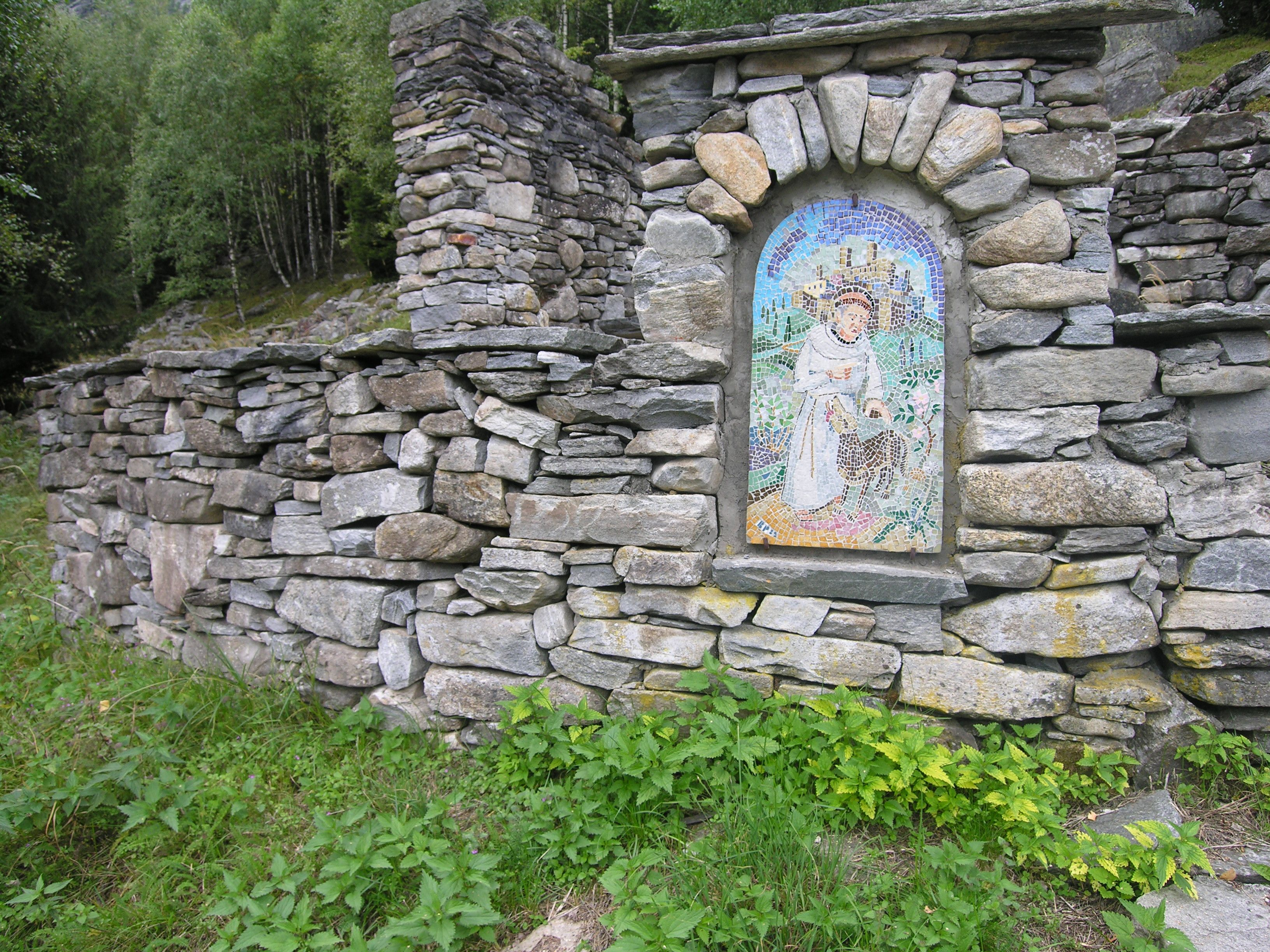
Mosaic embedded in stone wall, Italian area of Switzerland

Noted 19th-century mosaics include those by Edward Burne-Jones at St Pauls within the Walls in Rome."Photos of Burne-Jones mosaics in Rome at The Victorian Web". Another modern mosaic of note is the world's largest mosaic installation located at the Cathedral Basilica of St. Louis, located in St. Louis, Missouri."25 Things to Do in St. Louis". A modern example of mosaic is the Museum of Natural History station of the New York City Subway (there are many such works of art scattered throughout the New York City subway system, though many IND stations are usually designed with bland mosaics). Another example of mosaics in ordinary surroundings is the use of locally themed mosaics in some restrooms in the rest areas along some Texas interstate highways.

Some modern mosaics are the work of modernisme style architects Antoni Gaudí and Josep Maria Jujol, for example the mosaics in the Park Güell in Barcelona. Today, among the leading figures of the mosaic world are Elaine M. Goodwin (UK), Felice Nittolo (Italy), Brit Hammer (Netherlands), Dugald MacInnes (Scotland), Heather Hancock (USA), Kelley Knickerbocker (USA), Aida Valencia (Mexico), Emma Biggs (UK), Helen Nock (UK), Marcelo de Melo (Brazil), Sonia King (USA) and Saimir Strati (Albania).

=== In lamps ===
Turkish mosaic lamps have intricate patterns created from small pieces of coloured glass arranged in geometric and floral designs, within a metal or ceramic frame, lit from inside. The Tiffany lamp style, using metal frameworks, is similar, but uses large pieces, approaching closer to stained glass.

=== As a popular craft ===
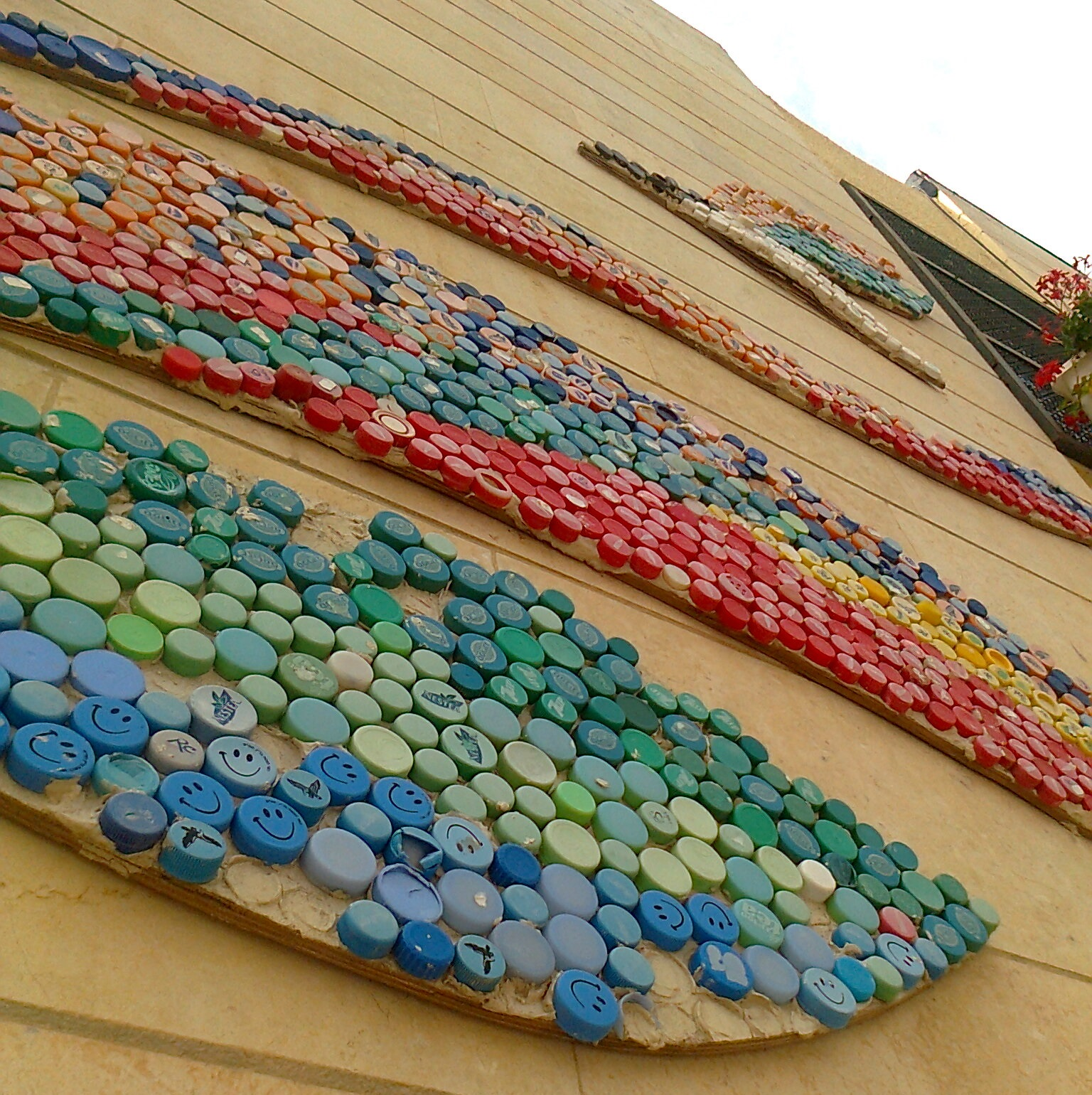
A detail of mosaic mural made of bottle screw tops. A high school in Jerusalem.

Mosaics have developed into a popular craft and art, and are not limited to professionals. Today's artisans and crafters work with stone, ceramics, smalti, shells, art glass, mirror, beads, and even odd items like doll parts, pearls, or photographs. While ancient mosaics tended to be architectural, modern mosaics are found covering everything from park benches and flowerpots to guitars and bicycles. Items can be as small as an earring or as large as a house.

Trencadís or pique assiette (a French term – "stolen from plate") is a mosaic made from pieces of broken pottery, china, glass, buttons, figurines, or jewelry which are cemented onto a base to create a new surface. Almost any form can be used as a base, and any combination of pieces can be applied, restricted only by the individual creator's imagination.

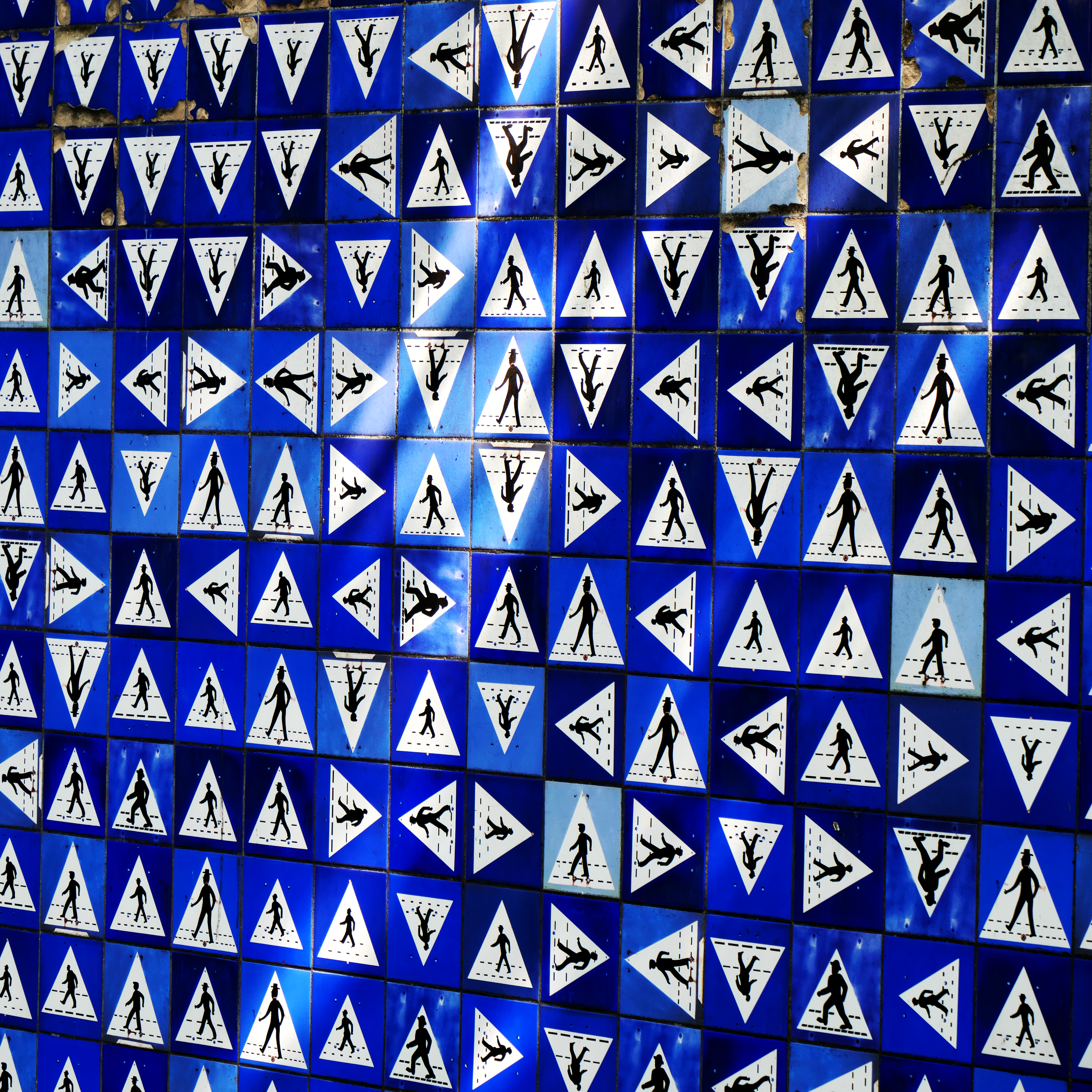
Art mosaic, University of Bremen, Germany.

=== In street art ===
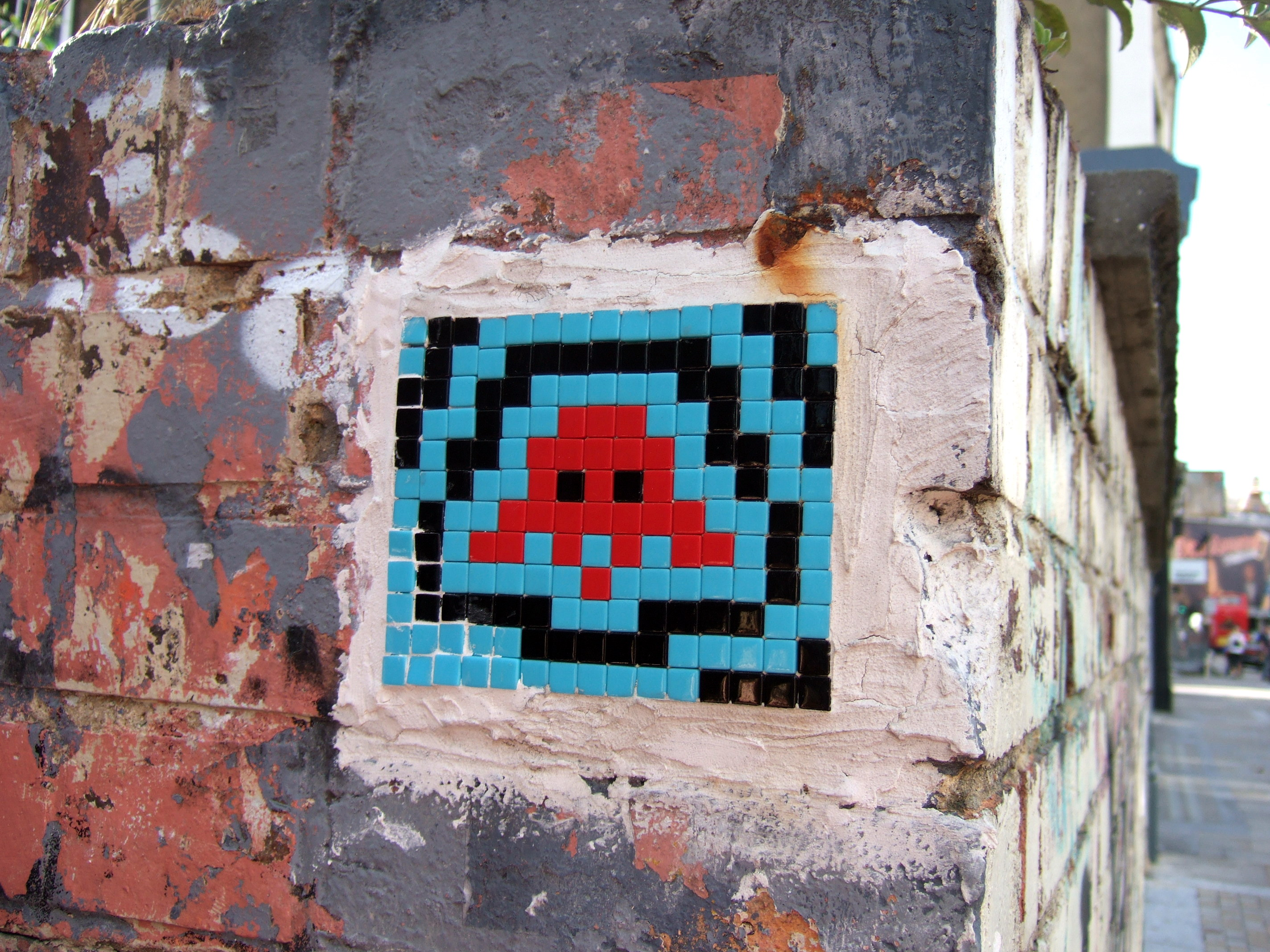
A work by Invader in Emaux de Briare.

In styles that owe as much to videogame pixel art and pop culture as to traditional mosaic, street art has seen a novel reinvention and expansion of mosaic artwork. The most prominent artist working with mosaics in street art is the French Invader. He has done almost all his work in two very distinct mosaic styles, the first of which are small "traditional" tile mosaics of 8 bit video game character, installed in cities across the globe, and the second of which are a style he refers to as "Rubikcubism", which uses a kind of dual layer mosaic via grids of scrambled Rubik's Cubes. Although he is the most prominent, other street and urban artists do work in Mosaic styles as well.

=== Calçada Portuguesa ===
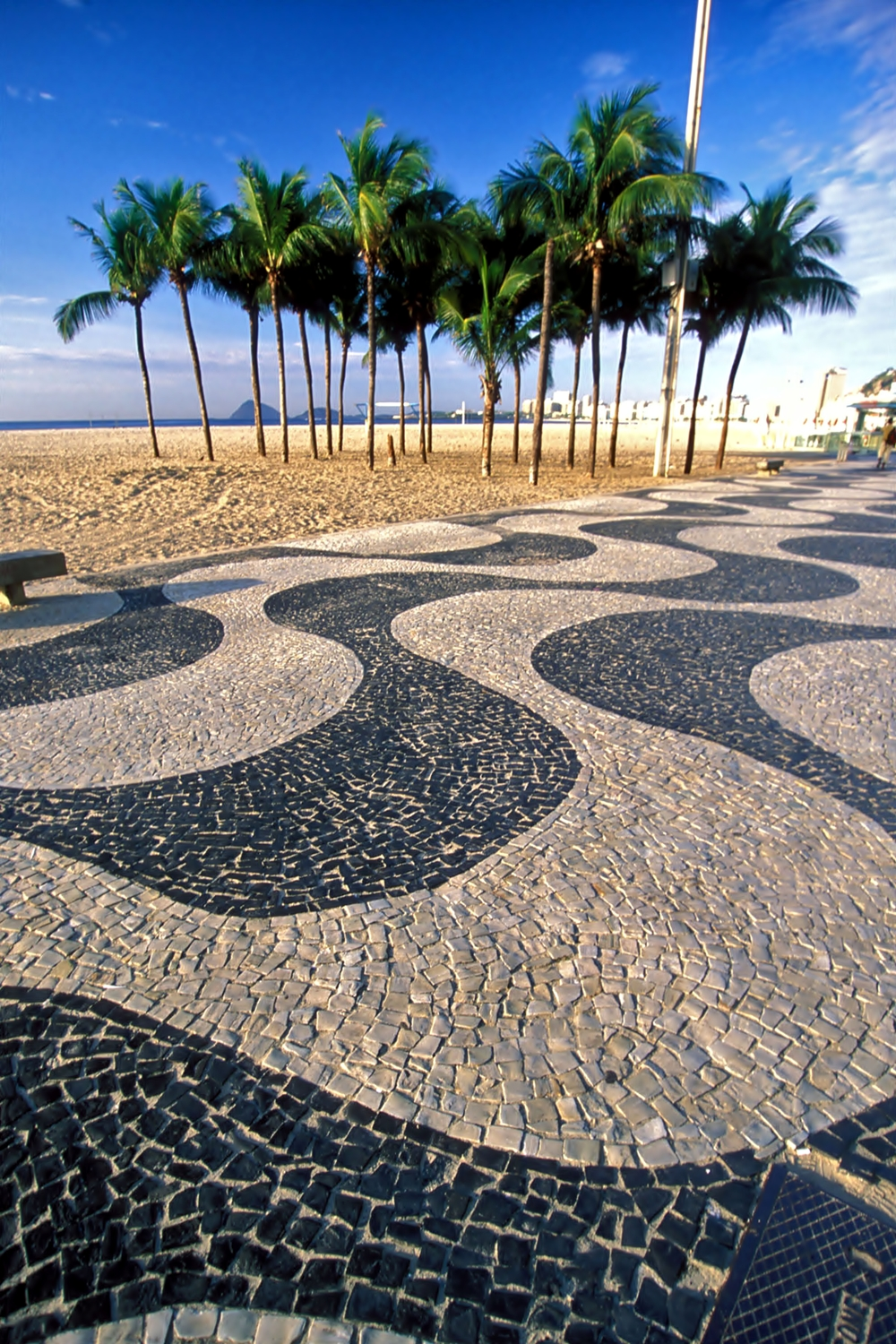
Copacabana (Rio de Janeiro)

Portuguese pavement (in Portuguese, Calçada Portuguesa) is a kind of two-tone stone mosaic paving created in Portugal, and common throughout the Lusosphere. Most commonly taking the form of geometric patterns from the simple to the complex, it also is used to create complex pictorial mosaics in styles ranging from iconography to classicism and even modern design. In Portuguese-speaking countries, many cities have a large amount of their sidewalks and even, though far more occasionally, streets done in this mosaic form. Lisbon in particular maintains almost all walkways in this style.

Despite its prevalence and popularity throughout Portugal and its former colonies, and its relation to older art and architectural styles like Azulejo, Portuguese and Spanish painted tilework, it is a relatively young mosaic artform, its first definitive appearance in a modernly recognizable form being in the mid-1800s. Among the most commonly used stones in this style are basalt and limestone.

== Terminology ==
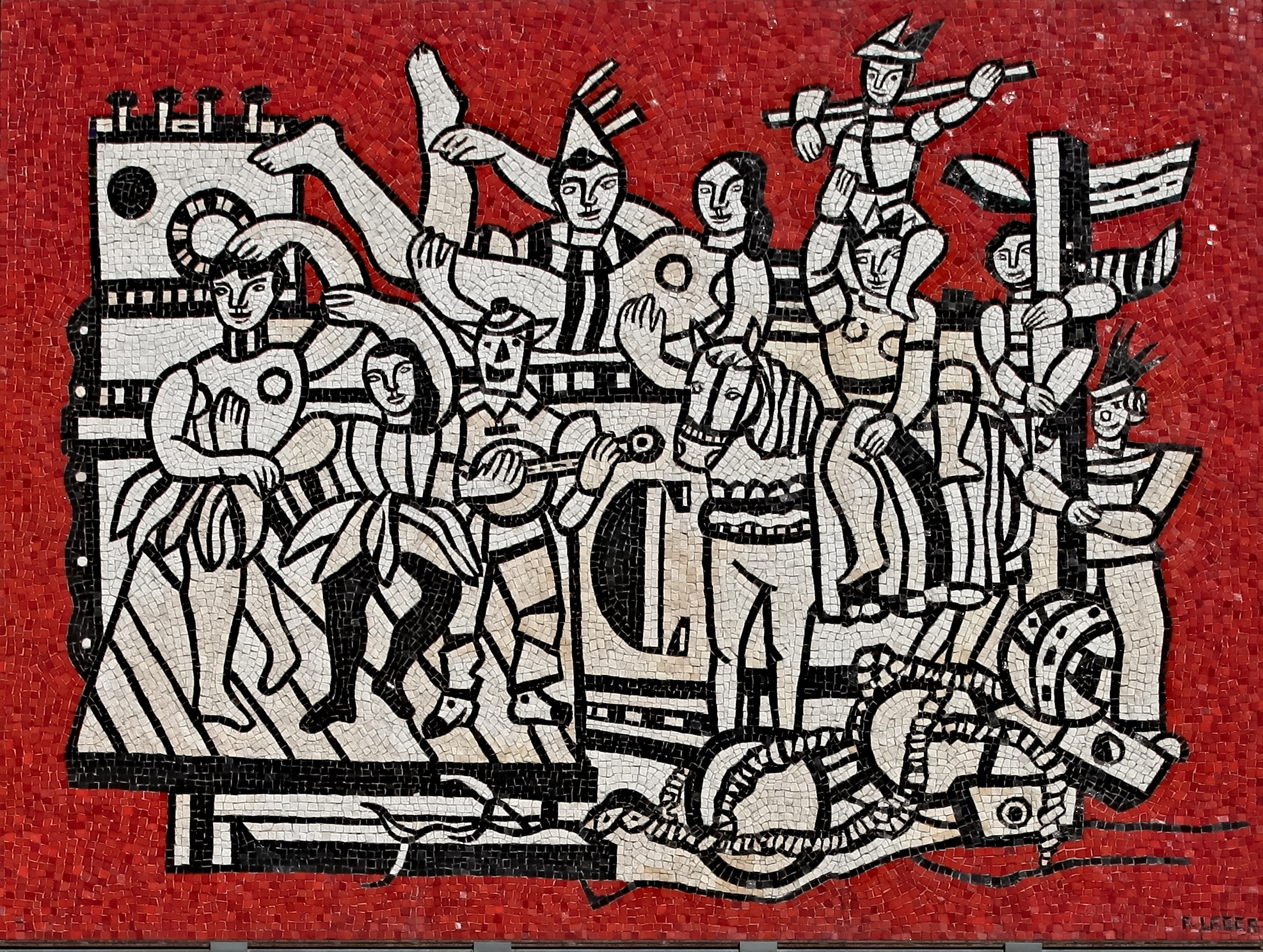
Fernand Léger – Grand parade with red background, mosaic 1958 (designed 1953). National Gallery of Victoria (NGV), Australia

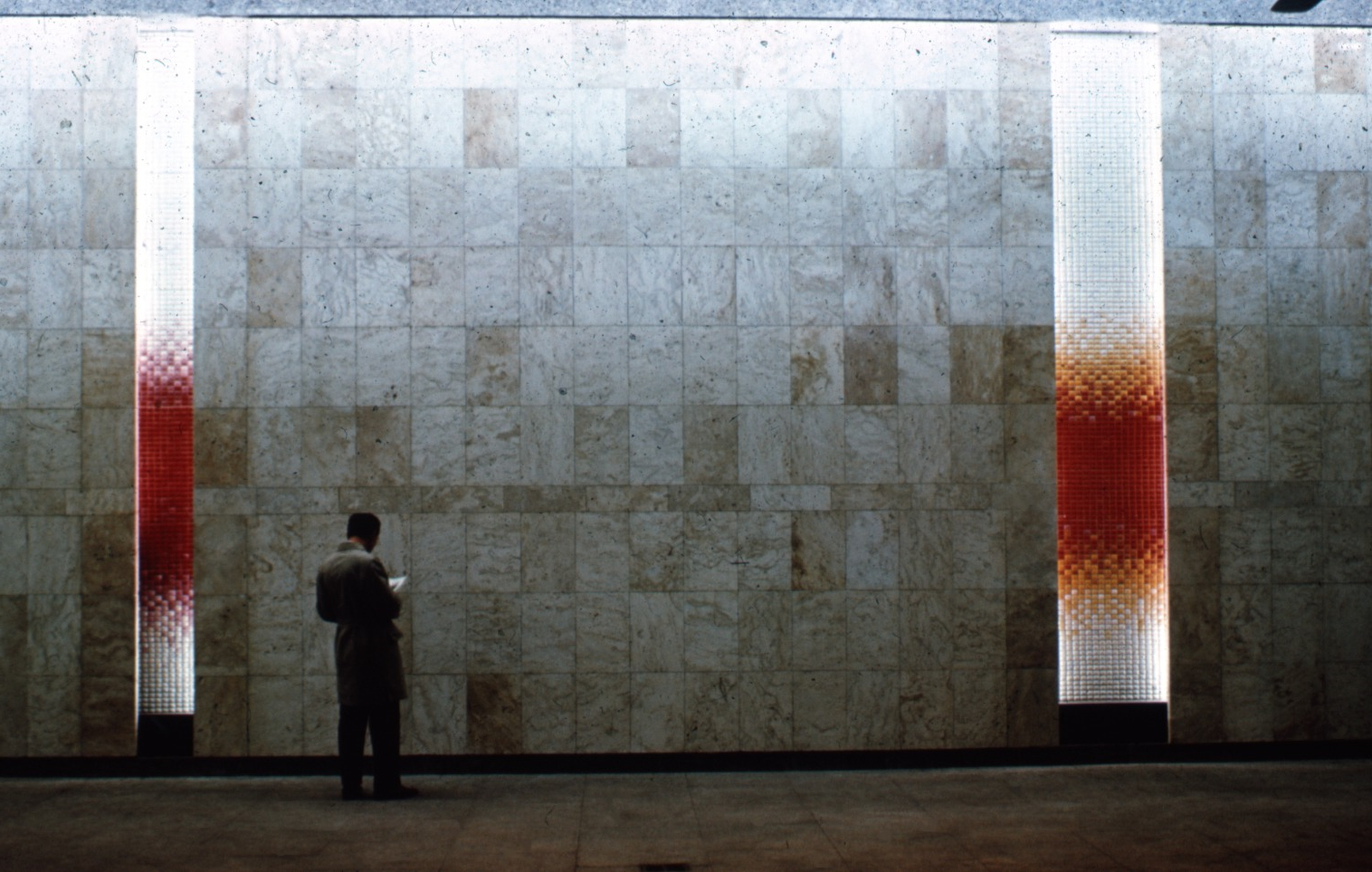
Op art ceramic mosaics together with travertine by Wojciech Fangor in a railway station in Warsaw, Poland (1963)

Mosaic is an art form which uses small pieces of materials placed together to create a unified whole. The materials commonly used are marble or other stone, glass, pottery, mirror or foil-backed glass, or shells.

The word mosaic is from the Italian mosaico deriving from the Latin mosaicus and ultimately from the Greek mouseios meaning belonging to the Muses, hence artistic. Each piece of material is a tessera (plural: tesserae). The space in between where the grout goes is an interstice. Andamento is the word used to describe the movement and flow of tesserae. The 'opus', the Latin for 'work', is the way in which the pieces are cut and placed.

Common techniques include:

- Opus regulatum: A grid; all tesserae align both vertically and horizontally.
- Opus tessellatum: Tesserae form vertical or horizontal rows, but not both.
- Opus vermiculatum: One or more lines of tesserae follow the edge of a special shape (letters or a major central graphic).
- Opus musivum: Vermiculatum extends throughout the entire background.
- Opus palladianum: Instead of forming rows, tesserae are irregularly shaped. Also known as "crazy paving".
- Opus sectile: A major shape (e.g. heart, letter, cat) is formed by a single tessera, as later in pietra dura.
- Opus classicum: When vermiculatum is combined with tessellatum or regulatum.
- Opus circumactum: Tesserae are laid in overlapping semicircles or fan shapes.
- Micromosaic: using very small tesserae, in Byzantine icons and Italian panels for jewellery from the Renaissance on.

== Two techniques ==
There are two main methods of creating mosaics. They are commonly referred to as the "direct method" of mosaic construction and the "indirect method" of mosaic construction.

=== Direct method ===
The direct method of mosaic construction involves directly placing (gluing) the individual tesserae onto the supporting surface. This method is well suited to surfaces that have a three-dimensional quality, such as vases. This was used for the historic European wall and ceiling mosaics, following underdrawings of the main outlines on the wall below, which are often revealed again when the mosaic falls away.

The direct method suits small projects that are transportable. Another advantage of the direct method is that the resulting mosaic is progressively visible, allowing for any adjustments to tile color or placement.

The disadvantage of the direct method is that the artist must work directly at the chosen surface, which is often not practical for long periods of time, especially for large-scale projects. Also, it is difficult to control the evenness of the finished surface. This is of particular importance when creating a functional surface such as a floor or a table top.

A modern version of the direct method, sometimes called "double direct", is to work directly onto fiberglass mesh. The mosaic can then be constructed with the design visible on the surface and transported to its final location. Large work can be done in this way, with the mosaic being cut up for shipping and then reassembled for installation. It enables the artist to work in comfort in a studio rather than at the site of installation.

=== Indirect method ===
The indirect method of applying tesserae is often used for very large projects, projects with repetitive elements or for areas needing site specific shapes. Tesserae are applied face-down to a backing paper using a water-soluble adhesive. Once the mosaic is completed in the studio it is transferred in sections to the site and cemented, paper facing outwards. Once fixed the paper is dampened and removed. This method is most useful for extremely large projects as it gives the maker time to rework areas, allows the cementing of the tesserae to the backing panel to be carried out quickly in one operation and helps ensure that the front surfaces of the mosaic tiles and mosaic pieces are flat and in the same plane on the front, even when using tiles and pieces of differing thicknesses. Mosaic murals, benches and tabletops are some of the items usually made using the indirect method, as it results in a smoother and more even surface.

== Mathematics ==
The best way to arrange variously shaped tiles on a surface leads to the mathematical field of tessellation.

The artist M. C. Escher was influenced by Moorish mosaics to begin his investigations into tessellation.

== Digital imaging ==
A photomosaic is a picture made up of various other pictures (pioneered by Joseph Francis), in which each "pixel" is another picture, when examined closely. This form has been adopted in many modern media and digital image searches.

A tile mosaic is a digital image made up of individual tiles, arranged in a non-overlapping fashion, e.g. to make a static image on a shower room or bathing pool floor, by breaking the image down into square pixels formed from ceramic tiles (a typical size is 1 in × 1 in (25 mm × 25 mm), as for example, on the floor of the University of Toronto pool, though sometimes larger tiles such as 2 in × 2 in (51 mm × 51 mm) are used). These digital images are coarse in resolution and often simply express text, such as the depth of the pool in various places, but some such digital images are used to show a sunset or other beach theme.

Recent developments in digital image processing have led to the ability to design physical tile mosaics using computer aided design (CAD) software. The software typically takes as inputs a source bitmap and a palette of colored tiles. The software makes a best-fit match of the tiles to the source image. In order to place tiles in the manner of opus vermiculatum the first step is to find edges of visually important objects in the image. A Python implementation of a complete pixel image to mosaic vector image algorithm is available.

== Robotic manufacturing ==
With high cost of labor in developed countries, production automation has become increasingly popular. Rather than being assembled by hand, mosaics designed using computer aided design (CAD) software can be assembled by a robot. Production can be greater than 10 times faster with higher accuracy. But these "computer" mosaics have a different look than hand-made "artisanal" mosaics. With robotic production, colored tiles are loaded into buffers, and then the robot picks and places tiles individually according to a command file from the design software.

== See also ==
- Pixel art
- Terrazzo
- Tessellation
- Church of the priest Félix and baptistry of Kélibia
- Mosaic of the Horses of Carthage
