= Consuelo Mata Parreño =

Valencian archaeologist

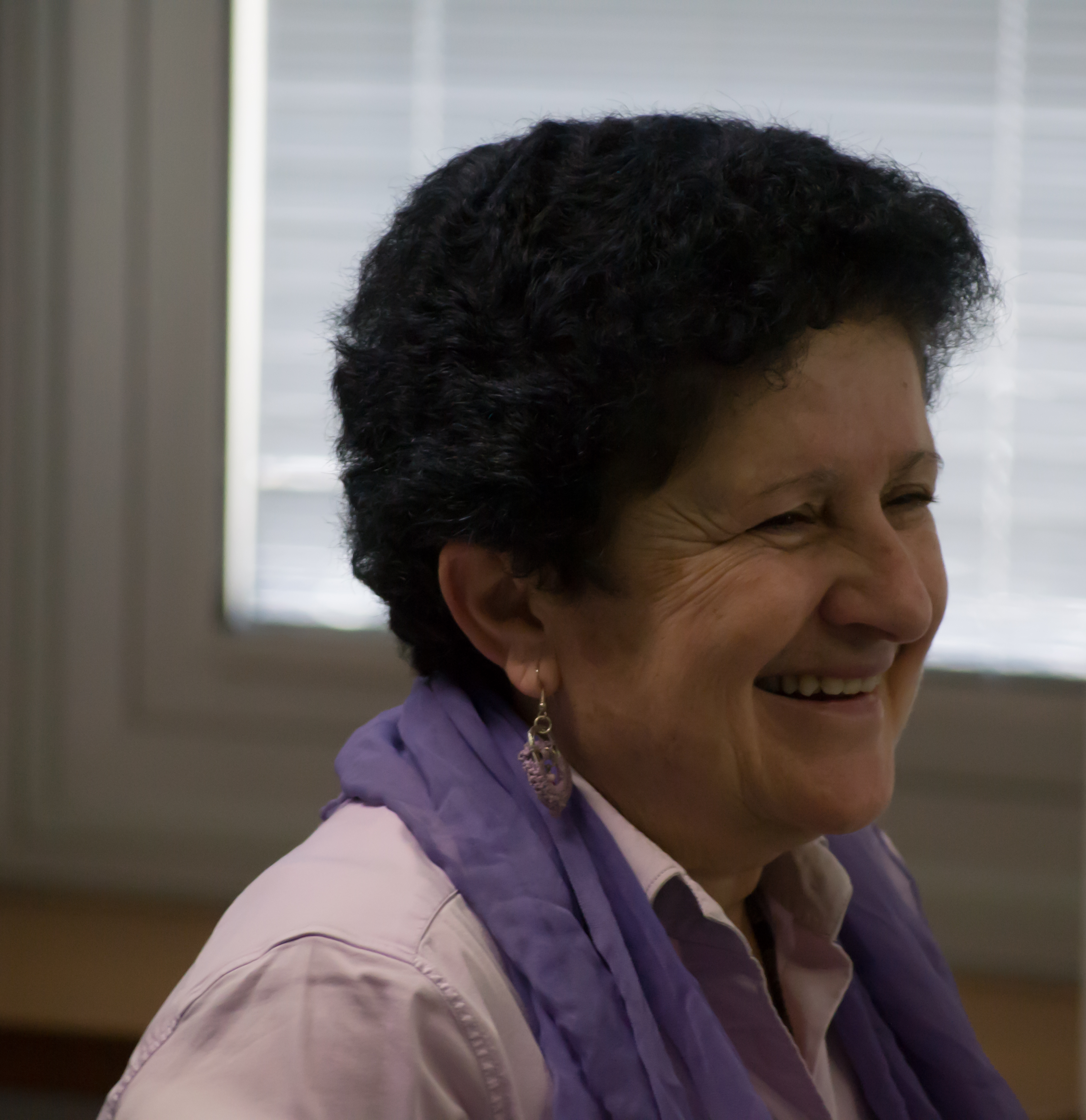
- Born: 1954 (age 71–72); Castelló de la Plana, Castelló, Spain

Academic work
- Discipline: Archaeology
- Sub-discipline: Iberian settlement Iberian ceramics Iberian flora and fauna
- Institutions: University of Valencia

Consuelo Mata Parreño (Universitat de Vamència) is a Spanish Teacher who specialises in Iberian material culture. She is currently the head teacher of the Department of Archaeology at the University of Valencia.

== Notable work ==
Mata, along with Helena Bonet Rosado and Joan Bernabeu Auban, published early work on the organisation of Iberian polities in the Valencian Community, arguing for hierarchical relationships between oppida in region.

Mata and Bonet also published a typology of Iberian fine (class A) and coarse (class B) pottery, which is widely used by Iberian archaeologists.

Mata led excavations at the Iberian site of Kelin, on the outskirts of modern Caudete de las Fuentes, and field surveys of the surrounding Requena-Utiel region. The site of Kelin continues to be presented through public education events, particular 'open door' days.

Mata and Bonet led the excavation of Puntal dels Llops, a small Iberian hilltop fort near modern Olocau.

In recent years, Mata and colleagues have published on the actual and symbolic uses of plant and animal products in Iberian life. This project has created online databases of the many types of evidence for these uses.

== See also ==
- Iberian culture

== Sources ==
- Bernabeu Auban, Joan; Bonet Rosado, Helena; Mata Parreño, Consuelo (1987), "Hipótesis sobre la organización del territorio edetano en época ibérica plena: El ejemplo del territorio de Edeta/Llíria", in Ruiz Rodríguez, Arturo; Molinos Molinos, Manuel (eds.), Íberos: Actas de la I jornadas sobre el mundo ibérico, Jaén 1985, Jaén: Ayuntamiento de Jaén, pp. 137–156
- Bonet Rosado, Helena; Mata Parreño, Consuelo (2002), El Puntal dels Llops: Un fortín edetano, València: Servicio de Investigación Prehistórica
- Mata Parreño, Consuelo (1991), Los Villares (Caudete de las Fuentes, Valencia): Origen y evolución de la cultura ibérica, Valencia: Servicio de Investigación Prehistórica
- Mata Parreño, Consuelo; Garibó Bodí, Joan; Valor Abad, Jeroni; Duarte Martínez, Francesc; Ferrer Eres, Miguel (2001), "Kelin (Caudete de la Fuentes, València) y su territorio", in Lorrio Alvarado, Alberto (ed.), Los Íberos en la Comarca de Requena-Utiel (Valencia), San Vicente de Raspeig: Universidad de Alicante, pp. 75–88
- Mata Parreño, Consuelo; Badal, Ernestina; Collado Mataix, Eva; Ripollès i Alegre, Pere Pau (2010), Flora Ibérica: De lo real a lo imaginario, València: Diputación de València
