= Helena Bonet Rosado =

Spanish archaeologist

- Born: 1953 (age 72–73); València, València, Spain

Academic background
- Education: University of València

Academic work
- Discipline: Archaeology
- Sub-discipline: Iberian settlement Iberian ceramics
- Institutions: Prehistory Museum of Valencia

Helena Bonet Rosado (born 1953, in València) is a Spanish archaeologist who specialises in Iberian material culture. She has published two books and numerous articles and chapters on Iberian archaeology. She is currently the Director of the Prehistory Museum of Valencia.

== Education and career ==
Bonet Rosado received her doctorate from the University of Valencia in 1993. In 1999, she was appointed deputy director and head of the Prehistoric research department at the Prehistory Museum of Valencia. She was appointed Director in 2005.

== Research ==
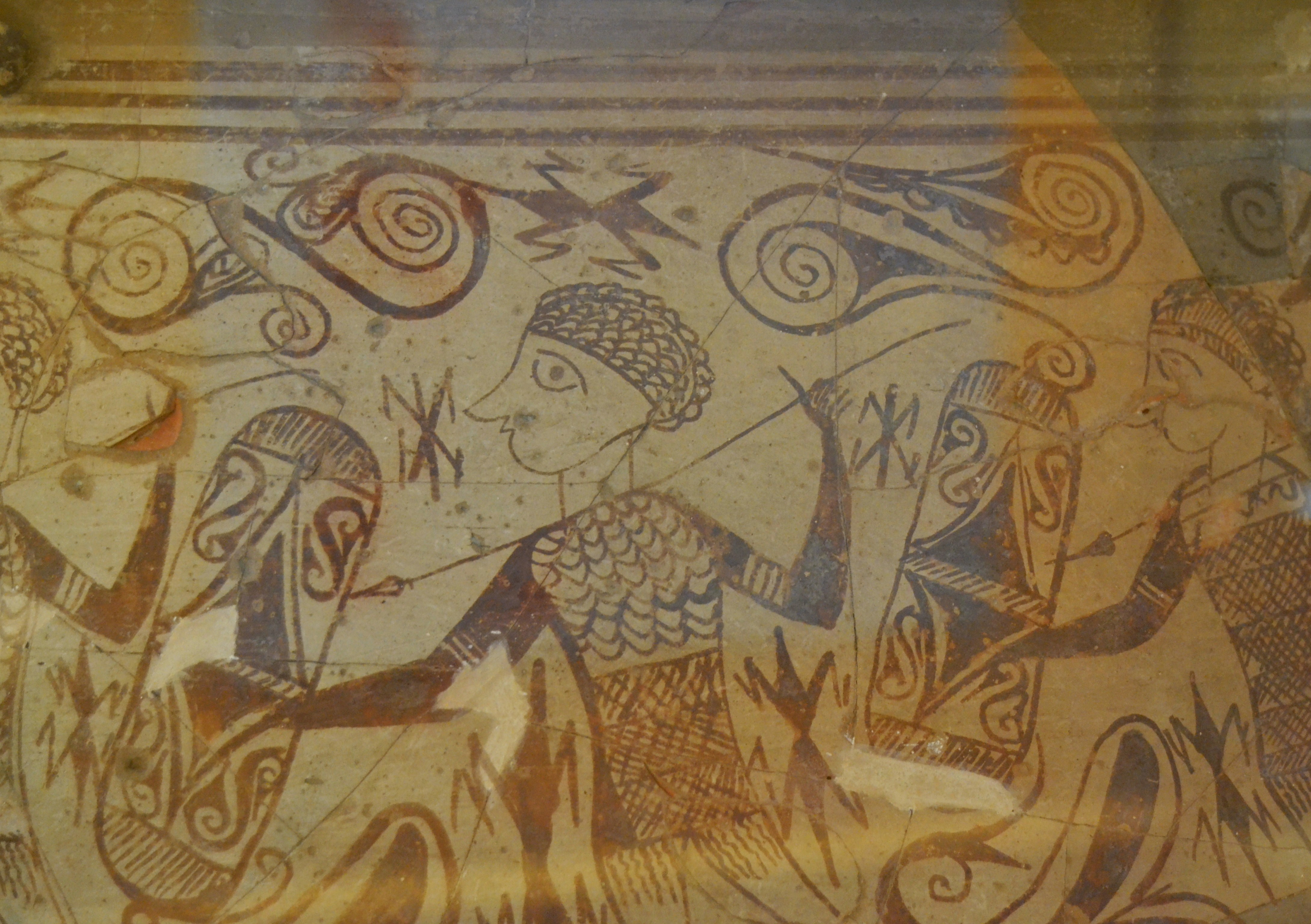
Detail from the 'Vase of the Warriors', an example of Edetan figurative pottery, in the Valencian Museum of Prehistory

Bonet, along with Consuelo Mata Parreño and Joan Bernabeu Auban, published early work on the organisation of Iberian polities in the Valencian Community, arguing for hierarchical relationships between oppida in the region.

Bonet and Mata also published a typology of Iberian fine (class A) and coarse (class B) pottery, which is widely used by Iberian archaeologists.

In 1995, Bonet published the site of ancient Edeta, modern Tossal de Sant Miguel, near the town of Llíria. Bonet argued that Edeta was the capital of a large Iberian polity covering the Camp de Túria, based on its exceptional size (up to 15 hectares), large houses with rich furnishing, specialised ceramic production, appearance in the historical accounts, and the surrounding systems of watchtowers or smaller hillforts and arterial roads.

Bonet and Mata led the excavation of Puntal dels Llops, a small Iberian hilltop fort near modern Olocau. Further excavations include the small Iberian sites of La Seña (Villar del Arzobispo) and Castellet de Bernabé (Llíria). Bonet and colleagues have more recently published on the ancient oppidum of La Bastida de les Alcusses, near modern Moixent.

Bonet has also published on the lives of women in Iberian prehistory, which was also the subject of a 2006 exhibition at the Prehistory Museum.

== Select publications ==
- Bernabeu Auban, Joan; Bonet Rosado, Helena; Mata Parreño, Consuelo (1987), "Hipótesis sobre la organización del territorio edetano en época ibérica plena: El ejemplo del territorio de Edeta/Llíria", in Ruiz Rodríguez, Arturo; Molinos Molinos, Manuel (eds.), Íberos: Actas de la I jornadas sobre el mundo ibérico, Jaén 1985, Jaén: Ayuntamiento de Jaén, pp. 137–156
- Bonet Rosado, Helena (1995), El Tossal de Sant Miquel de Llíria: la antigua Edeta y su territorio, València: Servicio de Investigación Prehistórica
- Bonet Rosado, H. & Mata Parreno, C. (1997). 'The Archaeology of Beekeeping in PreRoman Iberia.' Journal of Mediterranean Archaeology, 10(1), 33–47.
- Bonet Rosado, H. Mata Parreño, C. and Ferrer Eres. M.A. (2002). El Puntal dels Llops: Un fortín edetano. (Serie de trabajos varios no. 99). Valencia: Servicio de investigación prehistórica.
- Bonet Rosado, H. Albiach, R. (2006). Arqueologı́a en blanco y negro: La labor del SIP, 1927-1950: Diputación de Valencia.
- Bonet Rosado, H., Mata Parreño, C. & Moreno Martín, A. (2009). 'Iron Age Landscape and Rural Habitat in the Edetan Territory, Iberia (4th–3rd centuries BC).' Journal of Mediterranean Archaeology, 21(2), 165–189.
- Bonet, Helena; Vives-Ferrándiz, Jaime, eds. (2011), La Bastida de les Alcusses: 1928-2010, València: Museu de Prehistòria de València, pp. 10–29
- Bonet Rosado, H. (2014). 'Mujer en el Museu de Prehistòria de València.' Saguntum: Papeles Del Laboratorio De Arqueología De Valencia, (15), 105–113.
- Bonet-Rosado, H., & Mata-Parreño, C. (2015). 'Who Lives There? Settlements, Houses and Households in Iberia.' In The Cambridge Prehistory of the Bronze and Iron Age Mediterranean (pp. 471–487). Cambridge University Press.
- Bonet Rosado, Helena; Mata Parreño, Consuelo (2016), "Las cuentas claras: El rol de la mujer ibérica en la economía doméstica", in Delgado Hervás, Ana; Picazo Gurina, Marina (eds.), Los trabajos de las mujeres en el mundo antiguo: Cuidade y mantenimiento de la vida, Tarragona: Institut Català d'Arqueologia Clàssica
- Bonet Rosado, H., Pons, Á. (2016). Prehistoria y cómic. Museo de Prehistoria de Valencia.

== See also ==
- Iberian culture
- Prehistory Museum of Valencia
