= Temple of Juno Caelestis, Carthage =

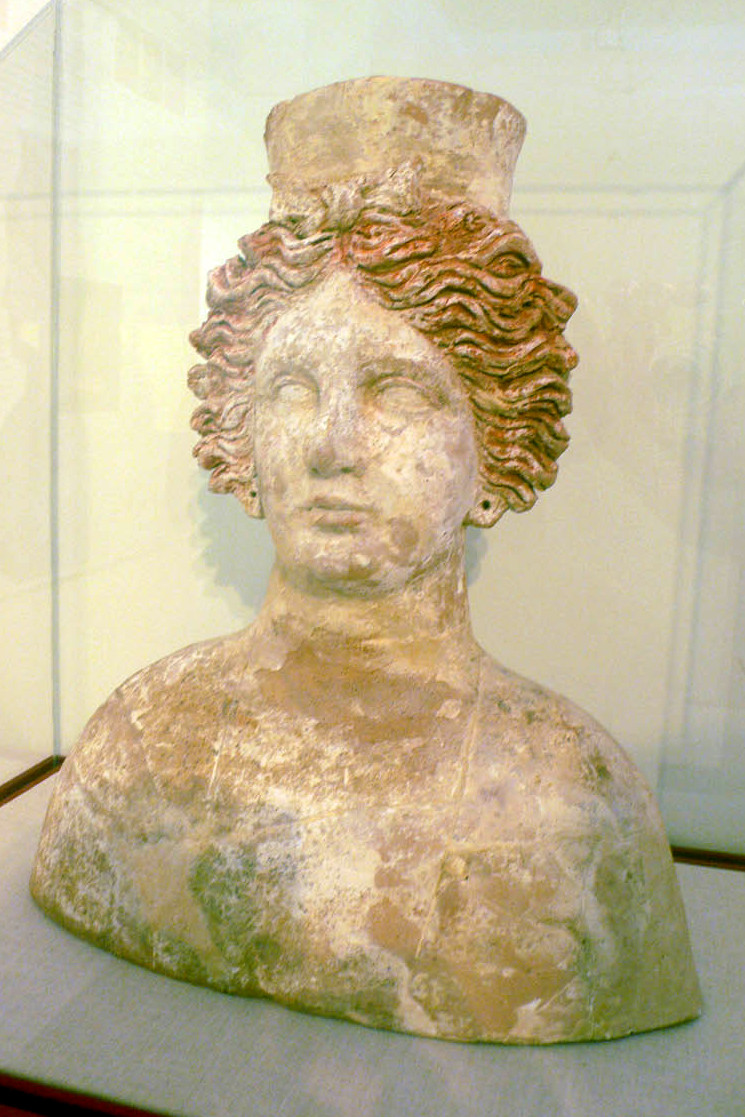
Tanit ibiza

Temple of Juno Caelestis was a temple in Carthage, constructed in the 2nd century AD and closed in 399. It was converted to a Christian church in 399 and was destroyed in 421. No remains of the temple have been found.

It was one of the biggest buildings of Roman Carthage as well as one of its biggest holy sites. The temple was dedicated to the indigenous goddess Tanit in her Roman shape of Juno, who was the protective city goddess of Carthage was well as one of the most worshipped deities in North Africa. The temple was not just a dominant institution of Carthage, but one of the major holy sites of the Roman Empire, and a destination of pilgrims from the empire.

During the 4th-and 5th-centuries, the temple played a central role in the religious conflict between Pagans and Christians. It was a symbol of Paganism in Carthage and targeted by the Christians. In 399 it was converted to the cathedral of the newly Christian Carthage. It was destroyed by the Christians in 421 under big protests from the Pagans, an act viewed as the victory of Christianity over Paganism.

== History ==
=== Foundation and function ===
Carthage was destroyed by Rome in 146 BC, and re-founded as the Roman Carthage in 49 BC.

The temple of Juno Caelestis was founded on the order of emperor Marcus Aurelius, which gives a date for its founded to between 161 and 180 AD. It was founded by the city forum, and became one of the main buildings of the city, dominating Carthage.

It was a massive building with several buildings in a temple area. The temple building itself was constructed in a park with trees, which was referred to as the biggest open site within the city of Carthage. The temple lay in the middle of the temple park and contained a monumental cult statue of her with the sun and the moon above her head, holding a cornucopia from which seeds of the pomegranate as well as other fruits flowed, symbolising the fertility of the earth and humanity.

The temple was dedicated to the Roman goddess Juno Caelestis, which was the Roman name for the popular indigenous goddess Tanit according to Interpretatio graeca. Tanit was the most popular deity among the indigenous population of the province; for the Roman colonists, Juno was a main deity and Queen of the Gods; and for the inhabitants of Carthage in general, Juno Caelestis was the protective city goddess. She was also referred to as Caelestis Afrorum Dea.

All of the combined factors, and the importance of Juno Caelestis of all major categories of people in the province, contributed to making her and her temple a major place of worship, and the temple became one of the most notable in Carthage and a center of the religious life of the city and province. It also came to be one of the major places of worship in the Roman Empire, since belief in her expanded around the empire with Roman soldiers. People were known to have worshipped her in all North Africa and Spain, making the temple a destination for pilgrimages, particularly during times of hardship.

The temple had its own clergy, composed of both male priests, priestesses, chorists and oracles. Priests and chorists performed public religious rituals around the city, and her Oracle priestesses were claimed to have been given the ability to make predictions by her name.

=== Religious conflict, closure and destruction ===
During the 4th-century, the temple, arguably the biggest Pagan place of worship in Carthage, became a target of criticism from the growing Christian minority. Augustine of Hippo is known as one of the major antagonists of the temple, and described it in his polemic writings.

During the 4th-century, the Roman Empire became Christian. However, the city of Carthage was known for its many pious Pagan adherents. During the persecution of pagans in the late Roman Empire, the Pagans of Carthage were persecuted by Christians. Carthage, being a stronghold of Pagans, became a scene of intense conflict between Christians and Pagans, and the Pagan holy sites of the city became targeted by Christian zealots. The temple of Juno Caelestis, being the biggest Pagan temple of Carthage, was particularly targeted by Christians, and defended by Pagans. It thus played a leading role in the religious conflicts of Carthage.

Eventually, all Pagan religious were banned in the Roman Empire, and the Pagan religious places of worship were closed. In 399, the temple of Juno Caelestis in Carthage was closed by force on order of the emperor. The temple was functioning as an active place of worship until its closure, and the closure was met with protests from the Pagan inhabitants of Carthage.

The temple was given to the Christians. The cult statue of the Goddess was destroyed. The temple was converted to a Christian church, and Bishop Aurelius of Carthage inaugurated it as the Christian cathedral of Carthage. The closure of the temple of Juno Caelestis, was followed by attacks and destruction of the other non-Christian holy sites of worship in Carthage. In the 401 Church Council of Carthage, the church fathers of Carthage under the leadership Bishop Aurelius wrote to the emperor and recommended him to order the destruction of all Pagan statues, including those kept in parks and gardens.

Twenty years after the closure of the temple, the city of Carthage still had Pagans protesting to the discrimination they were subjected to, and asked for the return of their temple. This was a fact that contributed to the final destruction of the temple. In 421, the Pagans of Carthage addressed the emperor and asked for the return of their temple, claiming that they had been given an oracle message from the Goddess to this effect. The same year, not long after this request, the emperor ordered the former temple (then in use as Christian cathedral), to be dismantled.

Under the direction of the Imperial tribune Ursus, who were sent to Carthage by the emperor to address the continuing religious tensions in the city and persecute Paganism and Manichaeism, the temple and all buildings belonging to the temple area complex was deliberately dismantled and made in to a Christian cemetery. This was a part of a campaign in which all remaining Pagan monuments in the city was destroyed as well.

=== Aftermath and legacy ===
The temple is known from the polemic Christian writings targeted toward it in its role as a Pagan center during the 4th- and 5th-centuries, such as the writings of Augustine of Hippo.

The destruction of the temple was viewed as a triumph by Christianity over Paganism:

"No craftsman will ever again make the idols that Christ has smashed ... so consider what power this Caelestis [sc. Goddess of the Skies] used to enjoy here at Carthage. What were the kingdoms of this earth?"

Augustine wrote the well known reflection:

"The kingdoms of idols, the kingdoms of demons are broken.... How great was the power of Caelestis which was in Carthage! Where is now the kingdom of Caelestis?"

Quodvultdeus described the temple in detailed in his Liber promissionum et praedicatorum.
