= Tanit =

Goddess of Carthage

- Goddess of civilized life
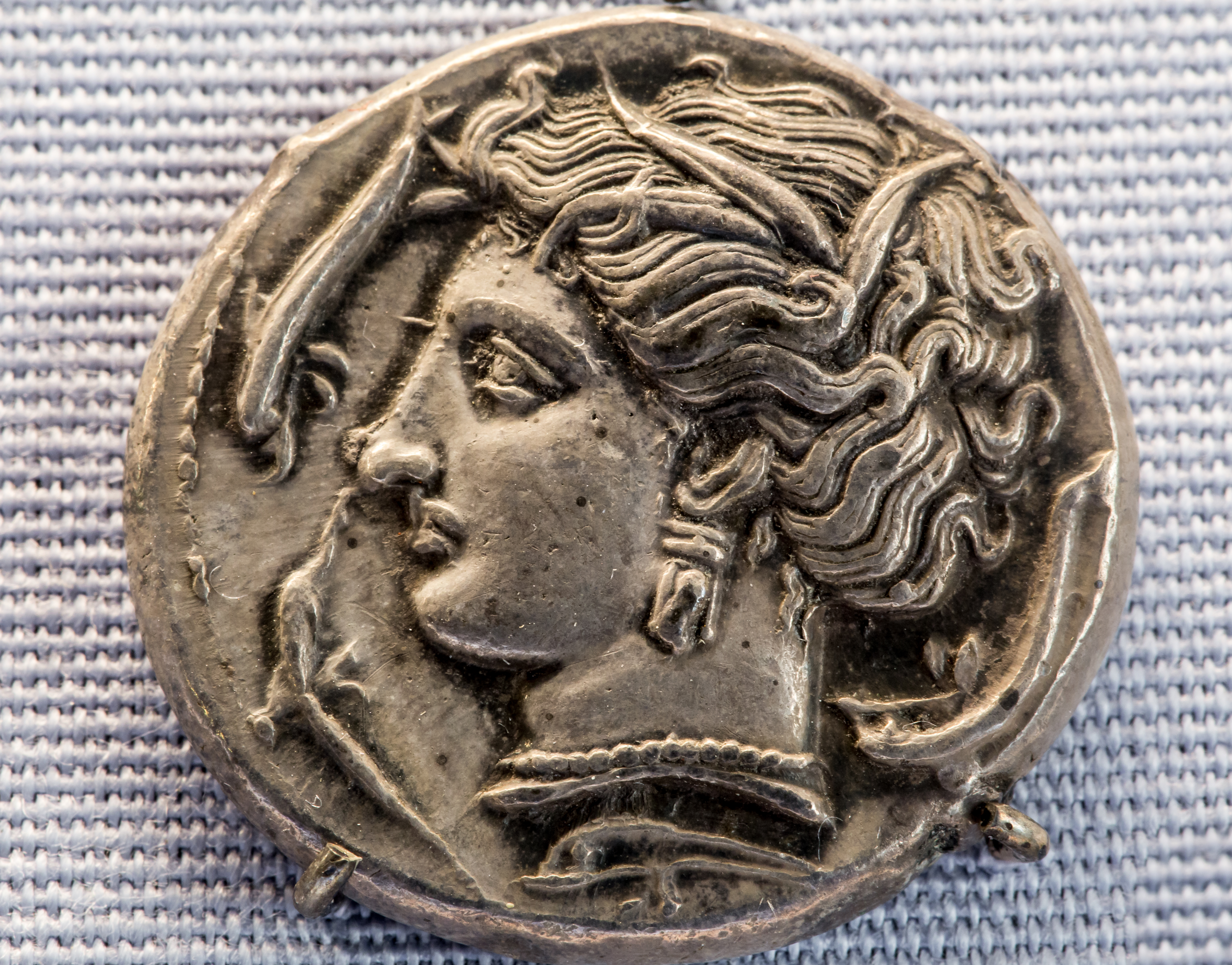
- Carthaginian coin depicting the face of Tanit on the front, and her symbols the horse and the date palm tree in the opposite side.
- Other names: Thinnith, Tannit, Tinnit, Tinnith
- Abode: In the heavens with Baal Hammon
- Animals: Horse, lion, dove
- Symbol: Aegis, spear, armor, chariot
- Tree: Olive tree, date palm
- Gender: Female
- Region: North Africa: Carthage, Numidia, Libya

Genealogy
- Avatar birth: Lake Tritonis
- Parents: Atlas, Triton
- Siblings: Pallas
- Consort: Baal Hammon

Equivalents
- Canaanite: Anat
- Roman: Minerva
- Egyptian: Neith
- Greek: Athena

Tanit or Tinnit (Punic: 𐤕𐤍𐤕 Tīnnīt) was a chief deity of Ancient Carthage and consort of Baal Hammon. (Note: Baal Hammon is the combination of the Libyan god Ammon and the Phoenician god Baal, this combination forms a stronger deity. The combination of the two deities was courtesy from the Carthagenian refugees when the King of the Massyles allowed them to settle in North Africa, so they adopted local custom of worship of Ammon and Tannit the local deities as a sign of appreciation to the locals.) Tanit represented the matriarchal aspect of Carthaginian society. She was the goddess of wisdom, civilization and the crafts; she was the defender of towns and homes where she is worshipped. Ancient North Africans used to put her sign on tombstones and homes to ask for protection. Her main temples were in Thinissut (Bir Bouregba, Tunisia), Cirta (Constantine, Algeria), Lambaesis (Batna, Algeria) and Theveste (Tebessa, Algeria). She had a yearly festival in Antiquity (Note: Herodotus.IV.180:"They celebrate a yearly festival of Athena, where their maidens are separated into two bands and fight each other with stones and sticks, thus (they say) honoring in the way of their ancestors that native goddess whom we call Athena. Maidens who die of their wounds are called false virgins. Before the girls are set fighting, the whole people choose the fairest maid, and arm her with a Corinthian helmet and Greek panoply, to be then mounted on a chariot and drawn all along the lake shore.") which persists to this day in many parts of North Africa but was banned by Muammar Gaddafi in Libya, who called it a pagan festival. She was identified with the Egyptian Neith and the Greek Athena. (Note: Herodotus. 4.189: "It would seem that the robe and aegis of the images of Athena were copied by the Greeks from the Libyan women; for except that Libyan women dress in leather, and that the tassels of their goatskin cloaks are not snakes but thongs of hide, in everything else their equipment is the same. And in fact, the very name betrays that the attire of the statues of Pallas has come from Libya; for Libyan women wear the hairless tasselled "aegea" over their dress, colored with madder, and the Greeks have changed the name of these aegeae into their "aegides." Furthermore, in my opinion the ceremonial chant2 first originated in Libya: for the women of that country chant very tunefully. And it is from the Libyans that the Greeks have learned to drive four-horse chariots.") (Note: Herodotus.IV.180:"They celebrate a yearly festival of Athena, where their maidens are separated into two bands and fight each other with stones and sticks, thus (they say) honoring in the way of their ancestors that native goddess whom we call Athena. Maidens who die of their wounds are called false virgins. Before the girls are set fighting, the whole people choose the fairest maid, and arm her with a Corinthian helmet and Greek panoply, to be then mounted on a chariot and drawn all along the lake shore.")

Tannit was also a goddess of rain, in modern-day Tunisia, it is customary to invoke Omek Tannou or Oumouk Tangou ('Mother Tannou' or 'Mother Tangou', depending on the region), in years of drought to bring rain.

== Etymology ==
The names themselves, Baal Hammon and Tanit, have Berber (Tamazight) linguistic structure. Many feminine names begin and end with "t" and "n" in the Berber languages; in Berber "Tanit" means spring or stream, though it does not appear in local theophorous names. Before 1955, the only attestations of the goddess's name were in Punic, which is written without vowels as "TNT" Tanit or "TNNT" as Tannit and was arbitrarily vocalized as "Tanit". In 1955, Punic inscriptions transliterated in Greek characters found at El-Hofra (near Constantine, Algeria) transliterated the name as Ancient Greek: Θινιθ (Thinith) and Ancient Greek: Θεννειθ (Thenneith). The inscriptions indicate that the name was likely pronounced as Tinnīt. Still, many scholars and writers continue to use "Tanit". She was later worshipped in Roman Carthage in her Romanized form as Dea Caelestis, Juno Caelestis, or simply Caelestis.

== Worship ==
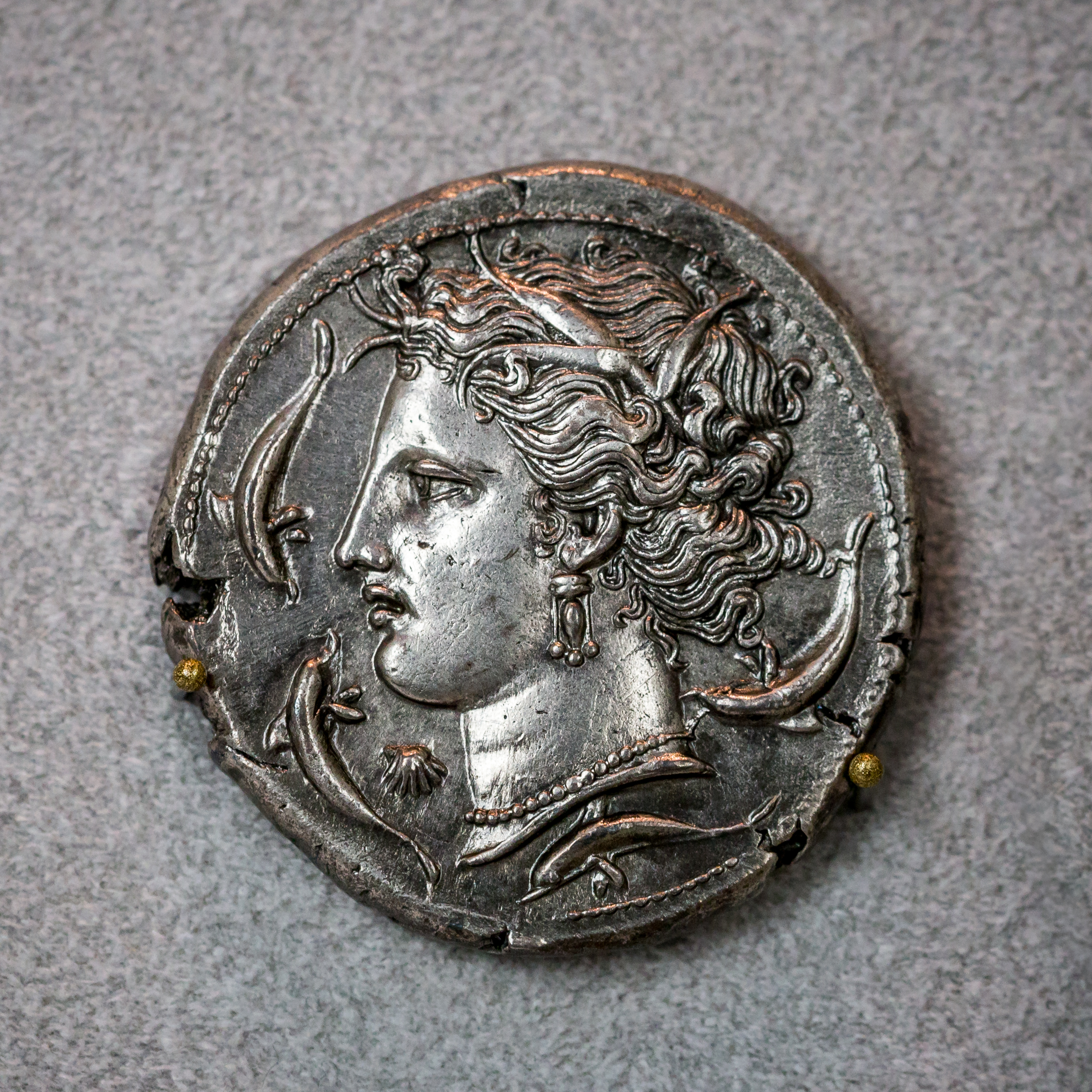
A Punic coin featuring Tanit, minted in Carthage between 330 and 300 BCE.

Tanit was worshiped in Punic contexts in the Western Mediterranean, in North Africa, Sicily, Malta, Gades and many other places into Hellenistic times when Rome expanded into North Africa. Long after the fall of Carthage, Tanit was still venerated in North Africa under the Latin name of: Juno Caelestis, for her identification with Juno by the Romans.

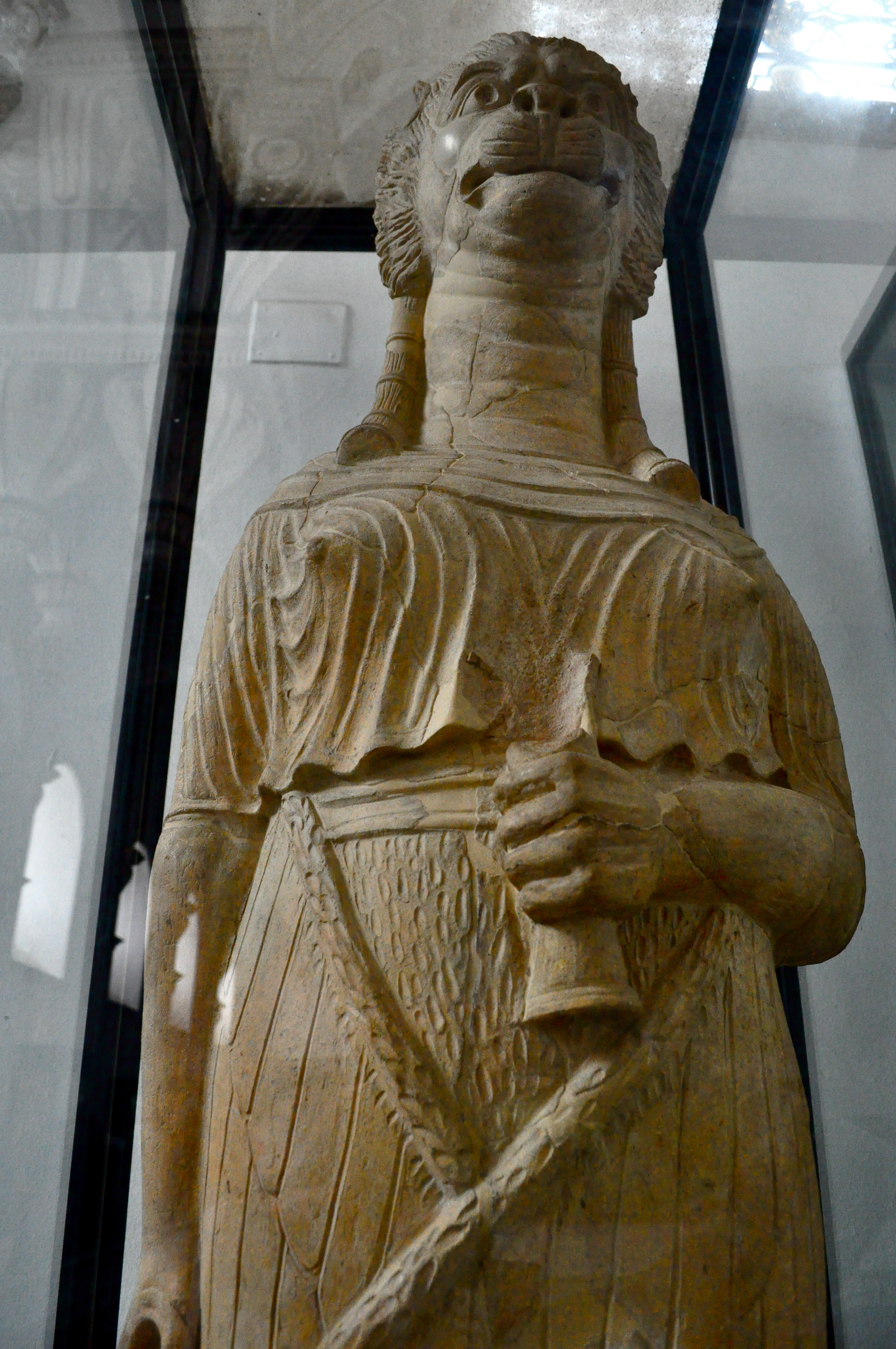
Tanit with a lion's head, from the Bardo Museum in Tunisia

Tanit's worship had a massive local cult of origin in North Africa, since in ancient Carthage, Tanit soon eclipsed the more established cult of Baal Hammon and, in the Carthaginian area at least, was frequently listed before him on the monuments. From the fifth century BC onwards, Tanit's worship is associated with that of Baal Hammon. She is given the epithet pene baal ('face of Baal') and the title rabat, the female form of rab ('chief' or 'lord'). In North Africa, where the inscriptions and material remains are more plentiful, she was, as well as a consort of Baal Hammon, a heavenly goddess of war, a "virginal" (unmarried) mother goddess and nurse, and, less specifically, a symbol of fertility, as are most female forms. Tanit's worship became popular in Carthage, especially after the separation between Carthage and Tyre in the 6th century BC when the traditional Phoenician cults of Astarte and Melqart were replaced by the worship of local North African deities Tanit and Baal Hammon.

Several of the major Greek goddesses were identified with Tanit by the syncretic interpretatio graeca, which recognized as Greek deities in foreign guise the gods of most of the surrounding non-Hellene cultures as the Greek historians such as Herodotus, Apollodorus, Pausanias mention that Athena has ancient Libyan origins in North Africa to Tanit herself as a goddess of strikingly similar aspects to Athena (Wisdom, War, Weaving..etc.). (Note: Herodotus. 4.189: "It would seem that the robe and aegis of the images of Athena were copied by the Greeks from the Libyan women; for except that Libyan women dress in leather, and that the tassels of their goatskin cloaks are not snakes but thongs of hide, in everything else their equipment is the same. And in fact, the very name betrays that the attire of the statues of Pallas has come from Libya; for Libyan women wear the hairless tasselled "aegea" over their dress, colored with madder, and the Greeks have changed the name of these aegeae into their "aegides." Furthermore, in my opinion the ceremonial chant2 first originated in Libya: for the women of that country chant very tunefully. And it is from the Libyans that the Greeks have learned to drive four-horse chariots.") (Note: Herodotus.IV.180: "They celebrate a yearly festival of Athena, where their maidens are separated into two bands and fight each other with stones and sticks, thus (they say) honoring in the way of their ancestors that native goddess whom we call Athena. Maidens who die of their wounds are called false virgins. Before the girls are set fighting, the whole people choose the fairest maid, and arm her with a Corinthian helmet and Greek panoply, to be then mounted on a chariot and drawn all along the lake shore.") Herodotus one of the most well known Greek historians who traveled throughout the region wrote about her the following:

"It would seem that the robe and aegis of the images of Athena were copied by the Greeks from the Libyan women; for except that Libyan women dress in leather, and that the tassels of their goatskin cloaks are not snakes but thongs of hide, in everything else their equipment is the same. And in fact, the very name betrays that the attire of the statues of Pallas has come from Libya; for Libyan women wear the hairless tasselled "aegea" over their dress, colored with madder, and the Greeks have changed the name of these aegeae into their "aegides." Furthermore, in my opinion the ceremonial chant first originated in Libya: for the women of that country chant very tunefully. And it is from the Libyans that the Greeks have learned to drive four-horse chariots."

— Herodotus, The histories, IV.189

Archeologists have recently also uncovered temples of Tannit dating back to the 4th century BC in the Azores islands dedicated to Tanit, archaeologists uncovered more than five hypogea type monuments (tombs excavated in rocks) and at least three 'sanctuaries' proto-historic, carved into the rock.

A shrine excavated at Sarepta in southern Phoenicia revealed an inscription that has been speculated to have connection between the goddesses Tanit and Astarte (Ishtar). Iconographic portrayals of both deities later become similar thanks to the influence of Carthage's trade empire across the mediterranean West to East. (Note: Archeologists note that perhaps since the deities have similar aspects when it comes to war, it was only natural of ancient people in the Eastern Mediterranean, after Carthaginian ships started to disembark back to their ancient homelands for trade, to adopt the same symbol of Tanit used in North Africa.) The relation between both deities has been proposed to be hypostatic in nature, representing similar aspects of the goddesses. In Carthage, Astarte another war goddess was worshipped alongside the goddess Tanit, the two deities are clearly not equal and one does not originate from the other. Although Tanit did not appear at Carthage before the 5th century BC, this shows her clear origins locally from North Africa. However it is well known that the Phoenician Astarte is a deity of wars of aggression, in direct contrast to Libyan Tanit which only goes to war in the defense of the civilization or the homeland where she is worshipped, called "defender of homes and families", giving direction and help to those who seek wisdom.

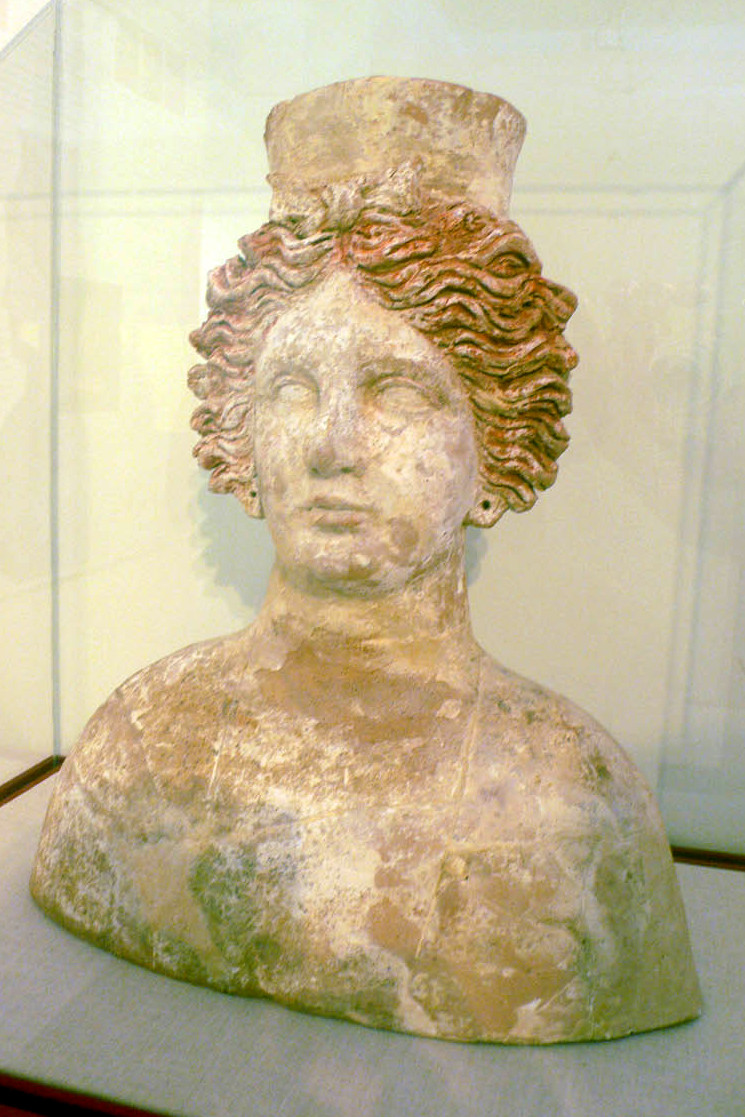
Bust of a female figure that has been sometimes hypothesized to represent Tanit, or probably Demeter found in the Carthaginian necropolis of Puig des Molins, dated 4th century BC, housed in the Museum of Puig des Molins in Ibiza, Spain

Carthagenians spread the cult of Tanit-Astarte to the Iberian Peninsula with the foundation of Gadir (modern day Cádiz) and other colonies, where the goddess might have been also assimilated to native deities. Her worship was still active after the Roman conquest, when she was integrated with the Roman goddess Juno (along with elements from Diana and Minerva) in a goddess named Dea Caelestis, the same way Baal Hammon was assimilated to Saturn. Dea Caelestis retained Punic traits until the end of classical antiquity in the fourth century CE. Similarly, long after the fall of Carthage, Tanit was still venerated in North Africa under the Latin name of: Juno Caelestis, for her identification with Juno.

The temple of Juno Caelestis, dedicated to the City Protector Goddess Juno Caelestis, which was the Roman name for Tanit, was one of the biggest building monuments of Roman Carthage, and became a holy site for pilgrims from all North Africa and Spain.

== Iconography ==
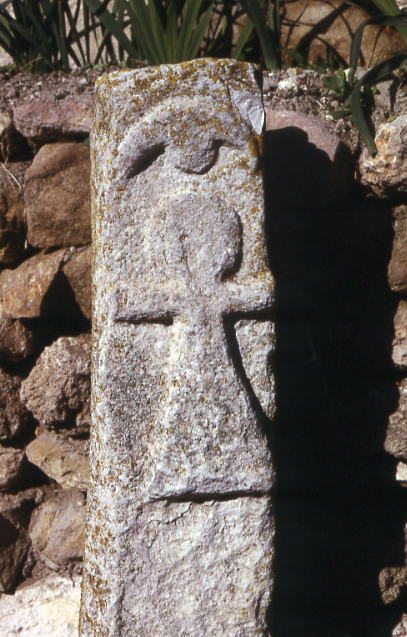
Stele with Tanit's symbol in Carthage's Tophet, including a crescent moon over the figure

Her symbol (the sign of Tanit), found on many ancient stone carvings, the symbol of Tannit, is a triangle representing the human body, surmounted by a circle representing the head, and separated by a horizontal line which represents the hands. Later, the trapezium was frequently replaced by an isosceles triangle. The symbol is interpreted by Danish professor of Semitic philology F. O. Hvidberg-Hansen as a woman raising her hands. She is also represented by the crescent moon and the Venus symbol.

Tanit is often depicted while riding a lion or having a lion's head herself, showing her warrior quality, and is often naked or bare-breasted, as a symbol of sexuality. She is also depicted winged, possibly under the influence of Egyptian artwork of Isis. Her associated animal and plants are the lion, the dove, the palm tree and the rose. Another motif assimilates her to Europa, portraying Tanit as a woman riding a bull that would represent another deity, possibly El.

== Rituals ==
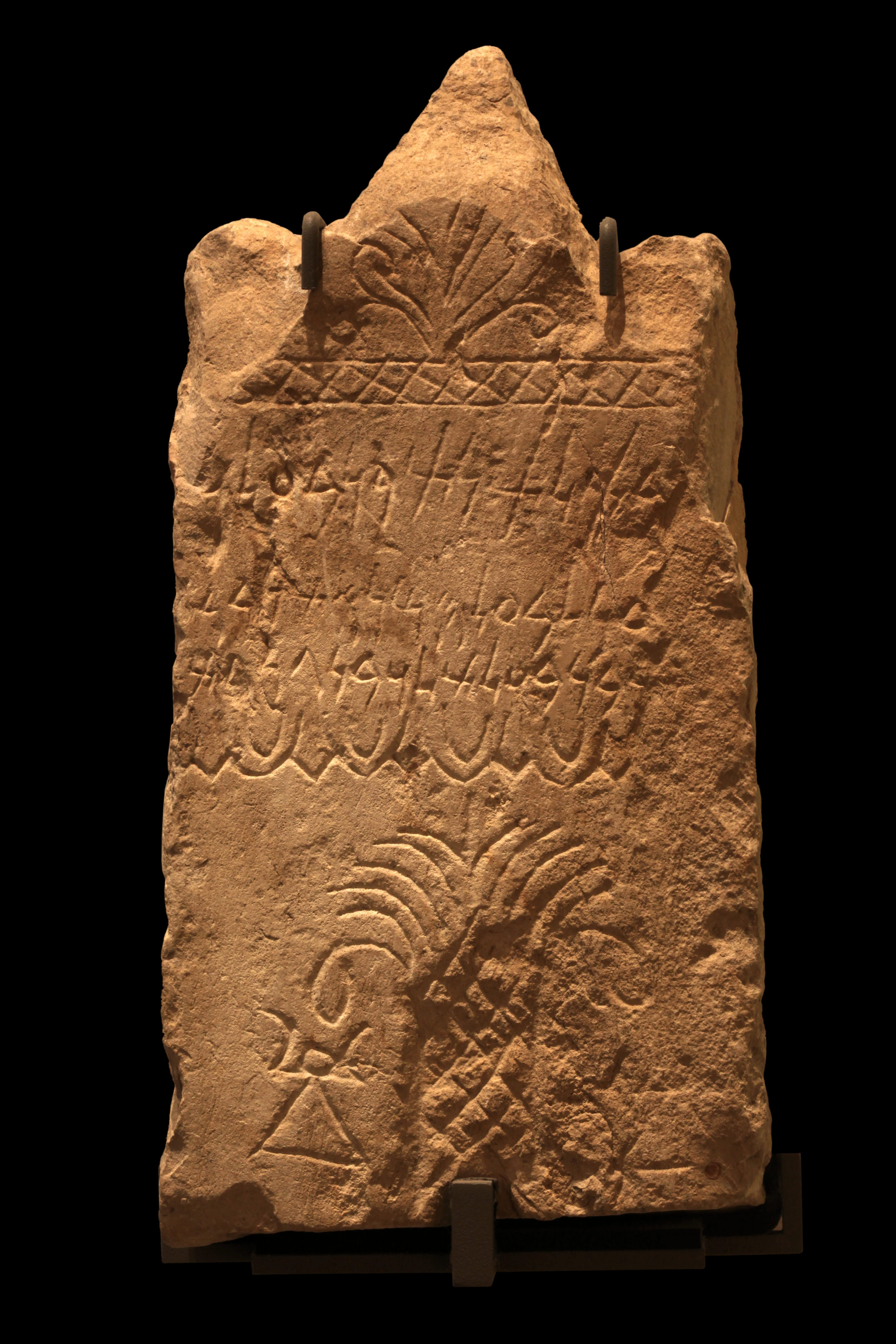
Stele with a Phoenician votive inscription, palm motif, and sign of Tanit, from the Carthage tophet, now in the Museum of Fine Arts, Lyon

Berber women's ritual in North Africa (Tunisia, Algeria and Morocco) evolved around healing fertility worship lamentation and life cycles, for Berber women these rituals are supposed to bring personal and communal satisfaction regarding: religious enactment, spirituality, emotional needs, reinforcement of family and social bonds, and achievement of pedagogical goals. These rituals may be public or private. An example of a public ritual is the right of Taghunja or tislit n unzar (bride of the rain). This is one of the oldest rites which seeks rain from the sky when the soil and agriculture are threatened by droughts and scarcity of water. The origin of this rite goes back to an ancient tradition of gathering and singing in front of the Goddess Tanit to implore her to bring rain when water is scarce, the performance of this rite changes from region to region but the differences in this respect are small. A procession goes from village to village and from one saint's sanctuary to another carrying an effigy of a female, on the way the bride is splashed with water from terraces and windows of houses, people give money gifts to the leader of the procession, the gathered money and food are used to prepare a big meal near a water spring or in a saint's sanctuary, usually on top of the hill.

=== Child sacrifice ===
The origins of Tanit are to be found in the pantheon of Ugarit, especially in the Ugaritic goddess Anat (Hvidberg-Hansen 1982). There is significant, albeit disputed, evidence, both archaeological and within ancient written sources, pointing towards child sacrifice forming part of the worship of Tanit and Baal Hammon.

Some archaeologists theorised that infant sacrifices have occurred. Lawrence E. Stager, who directed the excavations of the Carthage Tophet in the 1970s, believes that infant sacrifice was practiced there. Paolo Xella of the National Research Council in Rome summarised the textual, epigraphical, and archaeological evidence for Carthaginian infant sacrifice.

=== Archaeological evidence ===
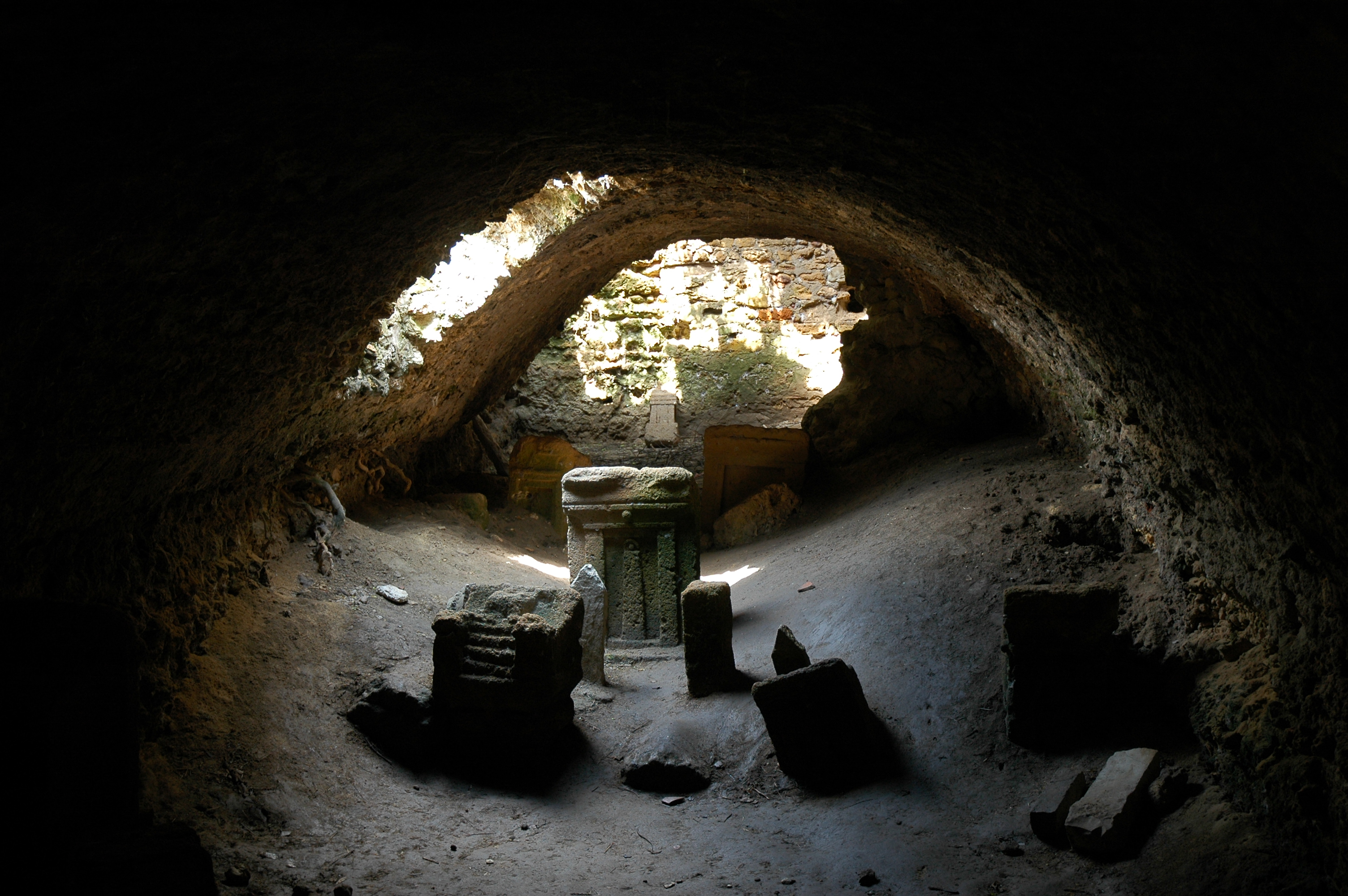
Stelae in the Tophet of Salammbó covered by a vault built in the Roman period

Tophet is a Hebrew term from the Bible, used to refer to a site near Jerusalem at which Canaanites and Israelites who rejected king Josiah's reforms in Yahwism by practicing Canaanite idolatry were said to sacrifice children. It is now used as a general term for all such sites with cremated human and animal remains. The Hebrew Bible does not specify that the Israelite victims were buried, only burned, although the "place of burning" was probably adjacent to the place of burial. We have no idea how the Phoenicians themselves referred to the places of burning or burial, or to the practice itself.

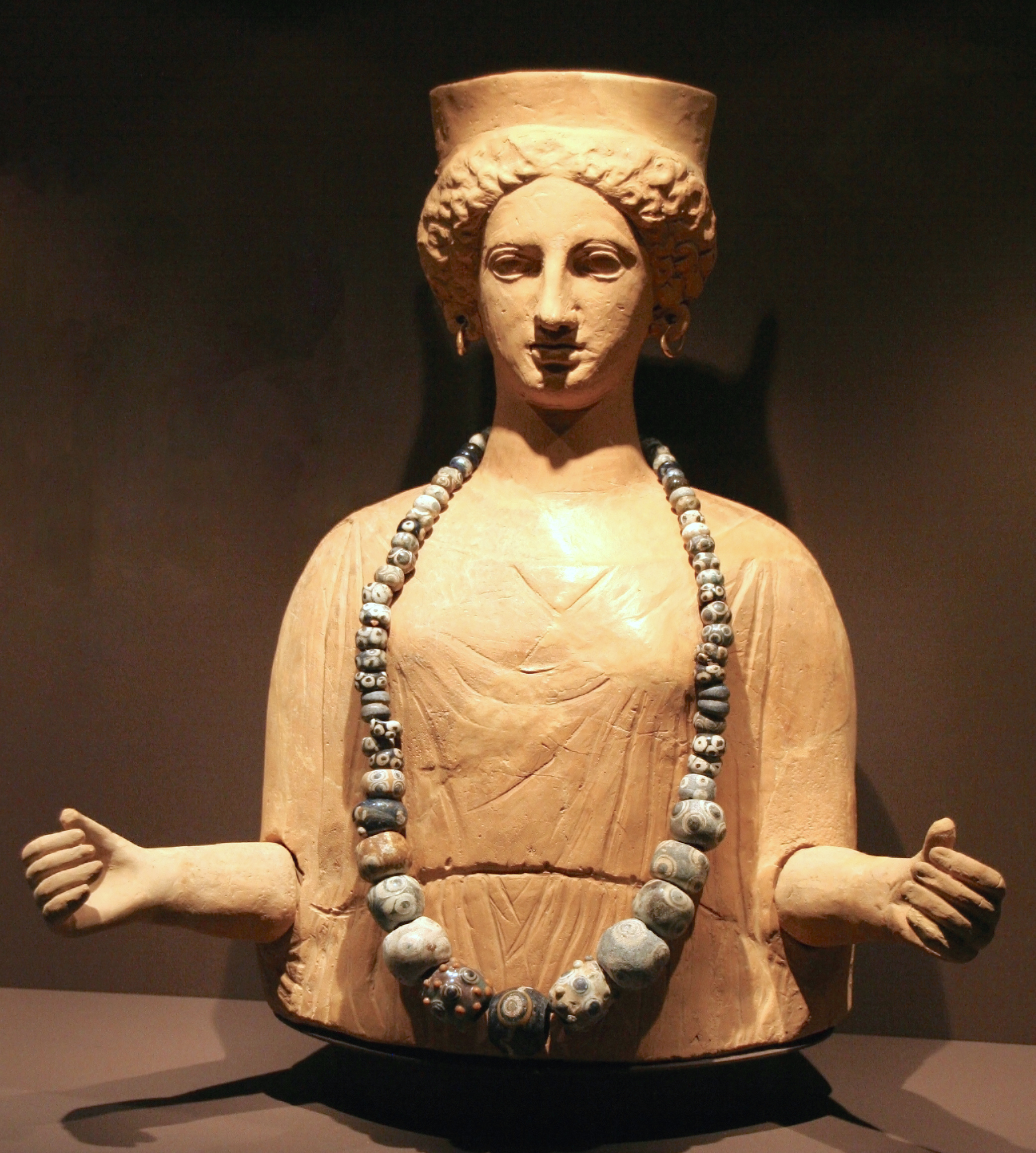
Adorned statue of the Punic goddess Tanit, 5th–3rd centuries BC, from the necropolis of Puig des Molins, Ibiza (Spain), now housed in the Archaeology Museum of Catalonia (Barcelona)

Several apparent tophets have been identified, chiefly a large one in Carthage, dubbed the Tophet of Salammbó, after the neighbourhood where it was unearthed in 1921. Soil in the Tophet of Salammbó was found to be full of olive wood charcoal, probably from the sacrificial pyres. It was the location of the temple of the goddess Tanit and the necropolis. Animal remains, mostly sheep and goats, found inside some of the Tophet urns, strongly suggest that this was not a burial ground for children who died prematurely. The animals were sacrificed to the gods, presumably in place of children (one surviving inscription refers to the animal as "a substitute"). It is conjectured that the children unlucky enough not to have substitutes were also sacrificed and then buried in the Tophet. The remains include the bodies of both very young children and small animals, and those who argue in favor of child sacrifice have argued that if the animals were sacrificed then so too were the children. The area covered by the Tophet in Carthage was probably over an acre and a half by the fourth century BCE, with nine different levels of burials. About 20,000 urns were deposited between 400 BCE and 200 BCE, with the practice continuing until the early years of the Christian era. The urns contained the charred bones of newborns and in some cases the bones of fetuses and two-year-olds. These double remains have been interpreted to mean that in the cases of stillborn babies, the parents would sacrifice their youngest child. This could be in line with an account from Cleitarchus, an early third-century BCE historian of Alexander the Great, of sacrifices being made to compensate perceived divine intervention having already occurred for the worshippers.

A detailed breakdown of the age of the buried children includes pre-natal individuals – that is, still births. It is also argued that the age distribution of remains at this site is consistent with the burial of children who died of natural causes, shortly before or after birth. Modern historians and archaeologists debate the reality and extent of this practice. Some scholars propose that all remains at the Tophet were sacrificed, whereas others propose that only some were. Outliers, such as Sergio Ribichini, have argued that the Tophet was "a child necropolis designed to receive the remains of infants who had died prematurely of sickness or other natural causes, and who for this reason were "offered" to specific deities and buried in a place different from the one reserved for the ordinary dead". He adds that this was probably part of "an effort to ensure the benevolent protection of the same deities for the survivors." However, this analysis is disputed; Patricia Smith and colleagues from the Hebrew University and Harvard University show from the teeth and skeletal analysis at the Carthage Tophet that infant ages at death (about two months) do not correlate with the expected ages of natural mortality (perinatal).

== Cultural references ==
In Gustave Flaubert's historical novel Salammbô (1862), the title character is a priestess of Tanit. Mâtho, the chief male protagonist, a Libyan mercenary rebel at war with Carthage, breaks into the goddess's temple and steals her veil.

In Kate Elliott's Spiritwalker trilogy, a romanticised version of Tanit is one of many deities commonly worshiped in a polytheistic Europa. The narrator, Catherine, frequently appeals to "Blessed Tanit, Protector of Women", and the goddess occasionally appears to her.

G. K. Chesterton refers to Tanit in his account of the Punic Wars, "War of the Gods and Demons" (a chapter of his book The Everlasting Man). Describing the cultural shock of foreign armies invading Italy when Hannibal crossed the Alps, Chesterton wrote:

It was Moloch upon the mountain of the Latins, looking with his appalling face across the plain; it was Baal who trampled the vineyards with his feet of stone; it was the voice of Tanit the invisible, behind her trailing veils, whispering of the love that is more horrible than hate.

In Margaret Atwood's The Blind Assassin there is an epigraph on a Carthaginian funerary urn that reads: "I swam, the sea was boundless, I saw no shore. / Tanit was merciless, my prayers were answered. / O you who drown in love, remember me."

In John Maddox Roberts's alternate history novel Hannibal's Children, in which the Carthaginians won the Second Punic War, one of the characters is Princess Zarabel, leader of the cult of Tanit.

Isaac Asimov's 1956 science fiction short story "The Dead Past" tells of Arnold Potterley, a professor of ancient history, who is obsessed with exonerating the Carthaginians of child sacrifice and tries to gain access to the chronoscope, a device which allows direct observation of past events. Eventually, Potterley's obsession with the Carthaginian past has far-reaching effects on the society of the present.

== Given name ==
In modern times the name, often with the spelling Tanith, has been used as a female given name, both for real people and in fiction.

== See also ==
- Aicha Kandicha
- Ankh
- Ishtar
- Isis
