= Carthaginian =

The term Carthaginian (Latin: Carthaginiensis [karˌtʰaːgɪniˈẽːsɪs]) usually refers to the civilisation of ancient Carthage.

It may also refer to:

- Punic people, the Semitic-speaking people of Carthage
- Punic language, also known as Carthaginian
- Carthaginian (ship), a three-masted schooner built in 1921
- Insurgent privateers, private armed vessels recruited by the insurgent governments during the Spanish American wars of independence, particularly those hailing from Cartagena, Colombia
