= Baths of Antoninus =

Ancient Roman baths in Carthage, Tunisia

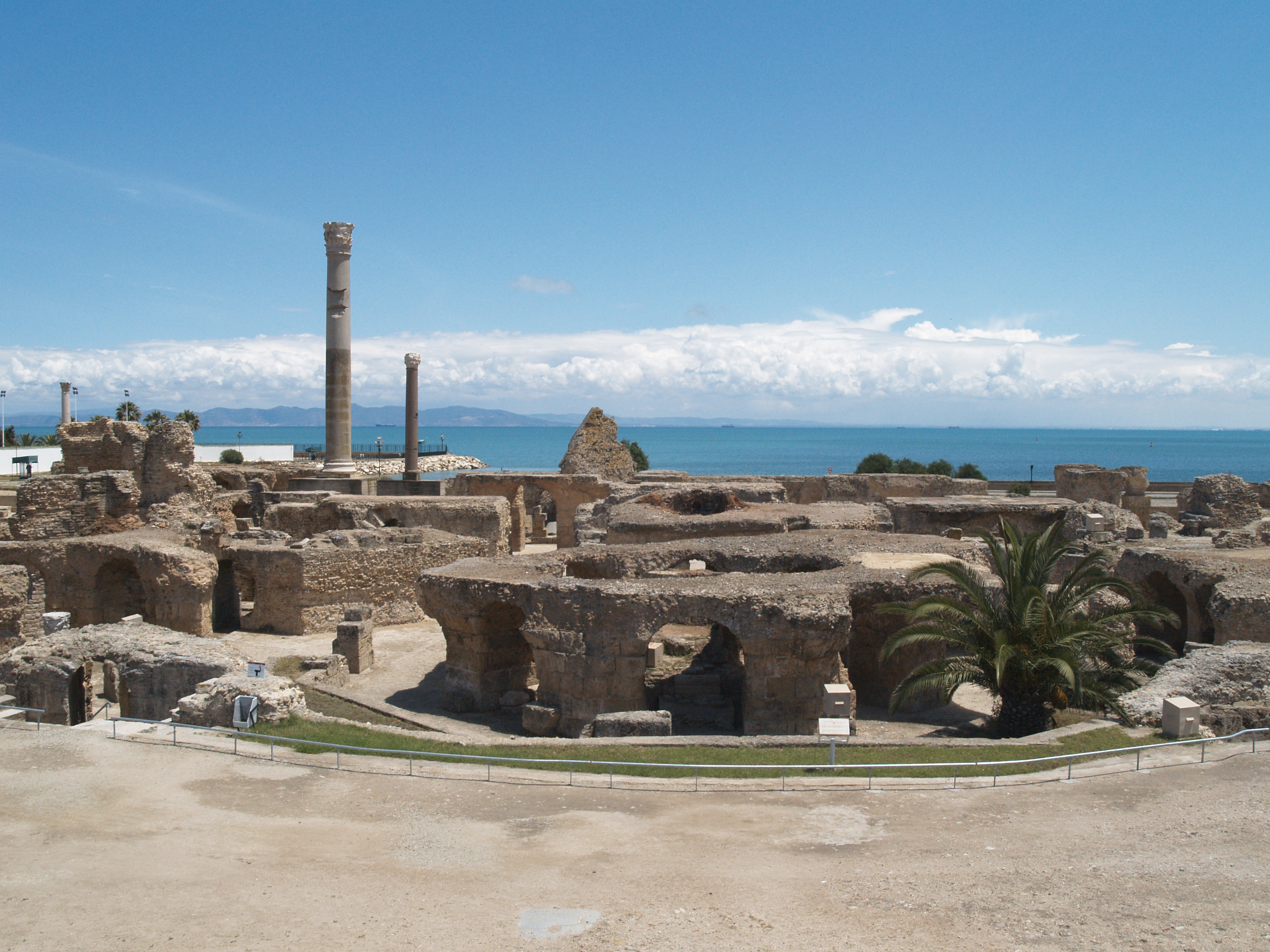
- Ruins of the Baths of Antoninus
- Interactive map of Baths of Antoninus
- 36.854321°N 10.335104°E
- Type: Thermae; Dimensions : Over 200 m on 100 m
- Location: Carthage, Tunisia
- Region: North Africa

History
- Built: 145-162
- Built by: Antoninus Pius

Site notes
- Height: 40 m (130 ft)
- Area: 35,000 m^{2} (380,000 sq ft)

UNESCO World Heritage Site
- Official name: Archaeological Site of Carthage
- Type: Cultural
- Criteria: ii, iii, vi
- Designated: 1979 (3rd session), together with Carthage
- Reference no.: 37
- Region: Arab States

The Baths of Antoninus or Baths of Carthage, located in Carthage, Tunisia, are the largest set of Roman thermae built on the African continent and one of three largest built in the Roman Empire. They are the largest outside mainland Italy. The baths are also the only remaining Thermae of Carthage that dates back to the Roman Empire's era. The baths were built during the reign of Roman Emperor Antoninus Pius.

After the Punics were defeated during the Third Punic War (149–146 BC), Roman traditions and customs took hold of Carthage. Carthage eventually became the third city for the allied Berber kings of the Romans. Under the control of Emperor Hadrian, the bathhouses were constructed in Carthage along the Mediterranean Sea. The bathhouses were given the name of the following emperor, Antoninus Pius. The baths were in use until Vandals destroyed them after invading Tunisia in 439 AD. The remains of the site are mostly in ruins, but few pieces have been preserved.

The baths are at the South-East of the archaeological site, near the presidential Carthage Palace. The archaeological excavations started during the Second World War and concluded by the creation of an archaeological park for the monument. It is also one of the most important landmarks of Tunisia. The Baths of Antoninus are structurally unique compared to other Roman bathhouses. The clay soil that bordered the Mediterranean Sea created a need for a larger foundation. The typical structure of the bathhouses had service areas in the basement, but the soft clay would not accommodate such developments. The designers had to adapt and raise the structure of this particular bath, making the Baths of Antoninus taller than other Roman bathhouses.

The baths are today part of the Archaeological site of Carthage on the list of World Heritage sites of UNESCO. On 17 February 2012, the Tunisian government proposed the Roman hydraulic complex Zaghouan-Carthage, that the baths are part of, as a future World Heritage site.

== Location ==
Map of the site of Carthage, the Baths of Antoninus are indicated as number 15

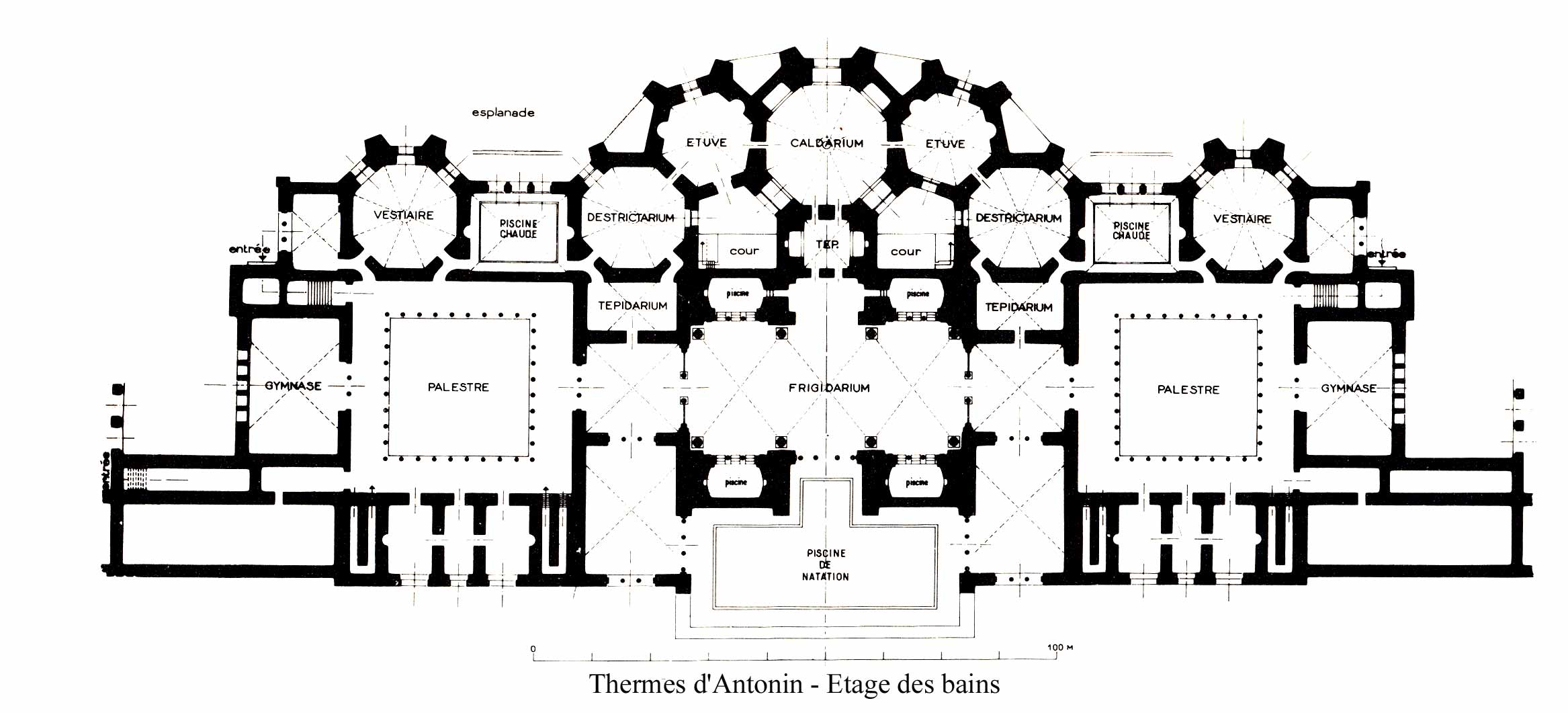
A reconstruction of the baths' floor plan

== See also ==
- List of Roman public baths
