= Olocau =

Olocau Olocau de Carraixet
- Municipality
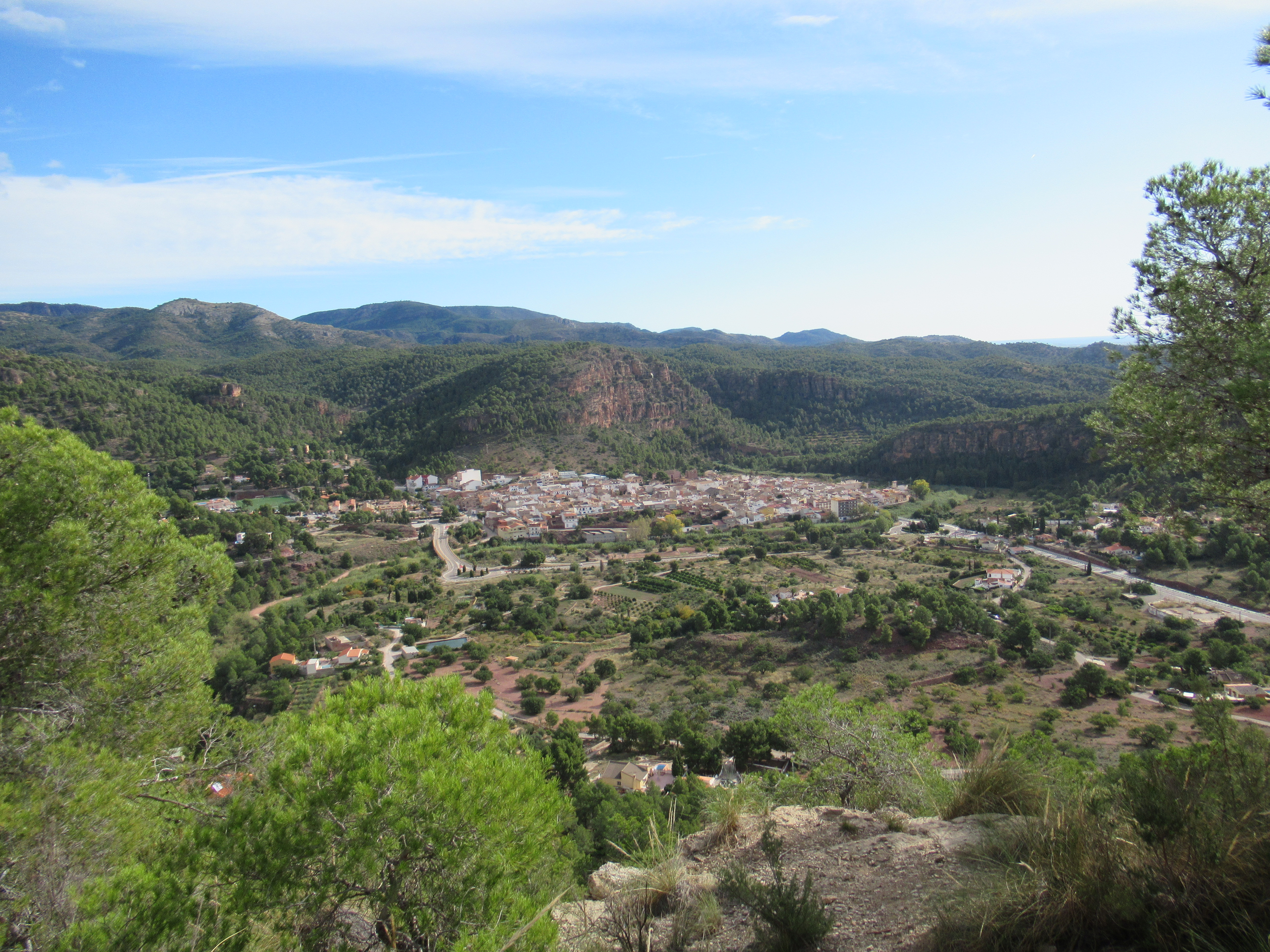
- The view of Olocau

- Coat of arms

- Location in Spain
- Coordinates: 39°42′0″N 0°31′54″W
- Country: Spain
- Autonomous community: Valencian Community
- Province: Valencia
- Comarca: Camp de Túria
- Judicial district: Llíria

Government
  - Alcaldesa: María Ascensión Arnal Navarro

Area
  - Total: 37.4 km^{2} (14.4 sq mi)
- Elevation: 200 m (660 ft)

Population (2025-01-01)
  - Total: 2,534
  - Density: 67.8/km^{2} (175/sq mi)
- Demonym(s): Olocauí, olocauina
- Time zone: UTC+1 (CET)
  - Summer (DST): UTC+2 (CEST)
- Postal code: 46169
- Official language(s): Valencian
- Website: Official website

Olocau (Valencian: Olocau de Carraixet; Spanish: Olocau) is a municipality in the comarca of Camp de Túria in the Valencian Community, Spain. The Iberian archaeological site of Puntal dels Llops is located in its surrounds.

== See also ==
- List of municipalities in Valencia
