= Mosaic of the Horses of Carthage =

Roman-era mosaic

Mosaic of the Horses
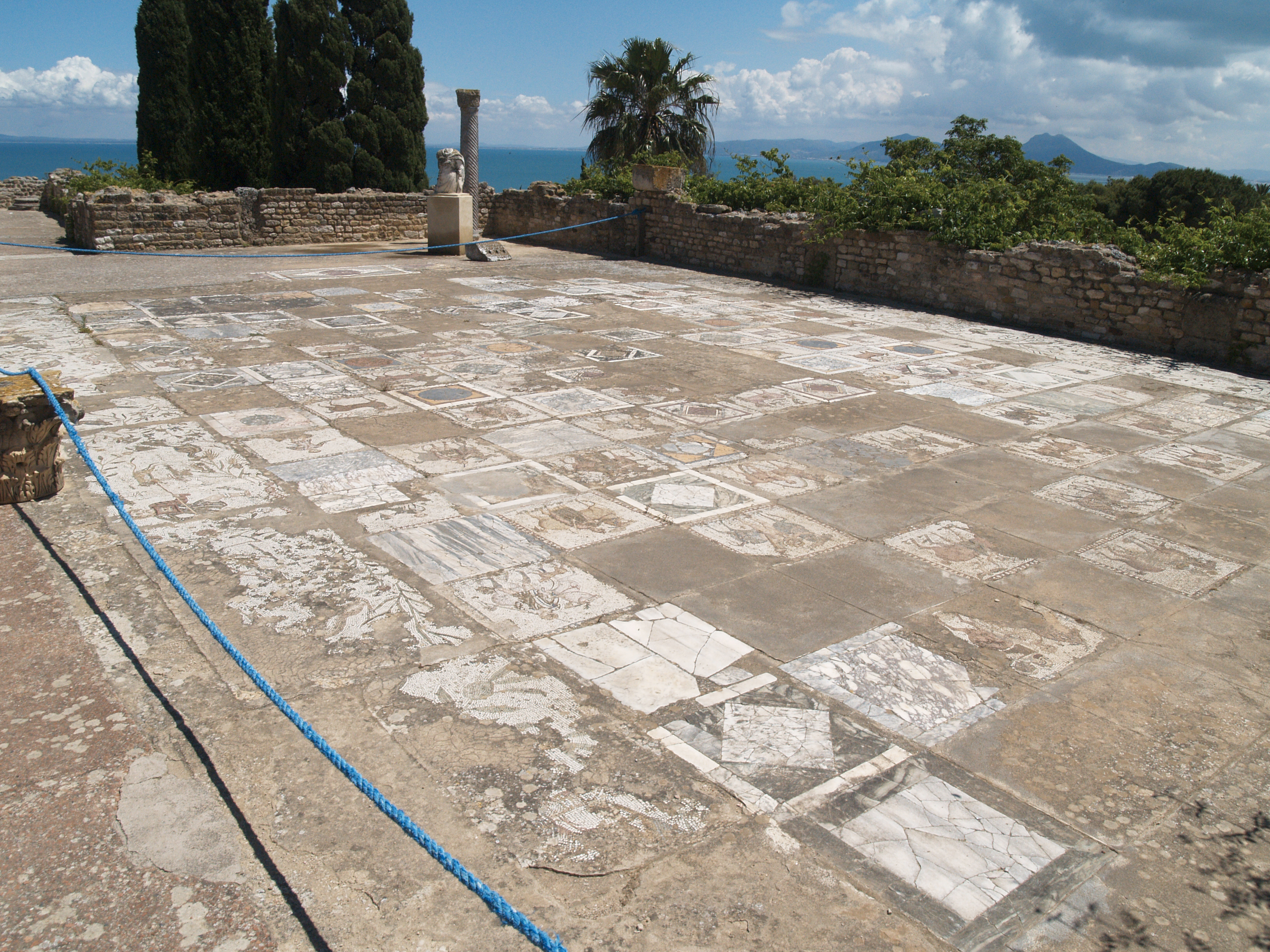
- General mosaic view
- Type: Mosaic
- Period/culture: 4th or 5th century
- Discovered: 1960; Carthage (present-day Tunisia)
- Coordinates: 36°51′28″N 10°19′53″E
- Registration: Kept in the archaeological park of the Roman villas of Carthage
- Culture: Ancient Rome

The mosaic of the horses is a Roman-era mosaic, approximately twelve meters by nine, discovered in 1960 at the archaeological site of Carthage, in present-day Tunisia, near the enigmatic monument known as the building with columns. It was later moved to the archaeological park of the Roman villas, near the so-called "Aviary Villa."

The mosaic is a checkerboard alternating between small figurative panels—mostly representations of horses—and geometric compositions. This "rich iconographic catalog [is] so far unparalleled," according to Azedine Beschaouch.

The combination of mosaic and opus sectile, along with its original theme, makes it one of the most interesting works uncovered at the site in the 20th century. However, it poses questions for specialists regarding its precise dating, inspiration, and influence beyond Africa, as some details are also found in the mosaics of the Roman villa of Casale in Sicily.

== History of the discovery ==
The mosaic was discovered during roadworks in late November 1960, when Tunisian workers widening the road between La Malga and the presidential palace of Carthage uncovered a large structure at the foot of the Hill of Juno. Historian Gilbert Charles-Picard referred to this structure as a "palace" due to its extensive mosaics. The building, located a few meters downhill from another structure with columns, was in a deteriorated condition.

Due to the construction work, excavations could not be conducted satisfactorily, resulting in an incomplete understanding of the discovery site. In general, the topography of Roman Carthage remains insufficiently known, despite a theoretical grid, established primarily through the work of Charles Saumagne. The city was divided into urban blocks measuring 142 meters by 35.50 meters, reconstructed from the overall layout of the site.

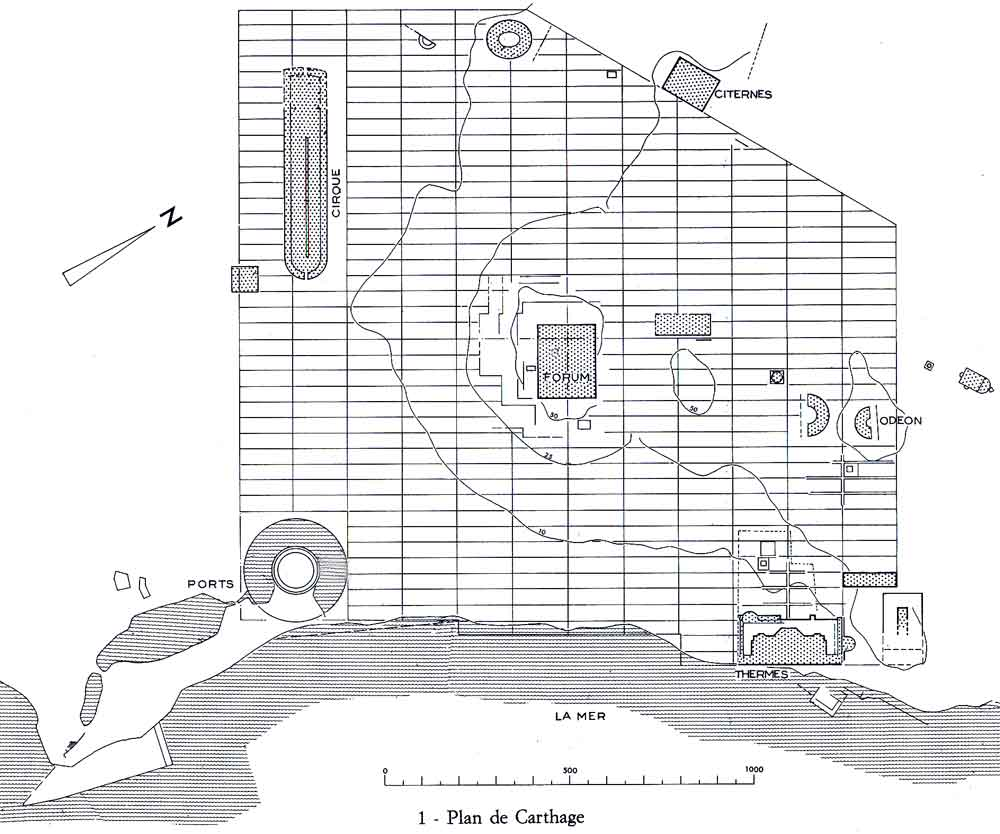
General plan of Roman Carthage, the place of discovery being close to the building to the east of the forum.

Map of the ancient remains in Carthage with the place of discovery near No. 8.

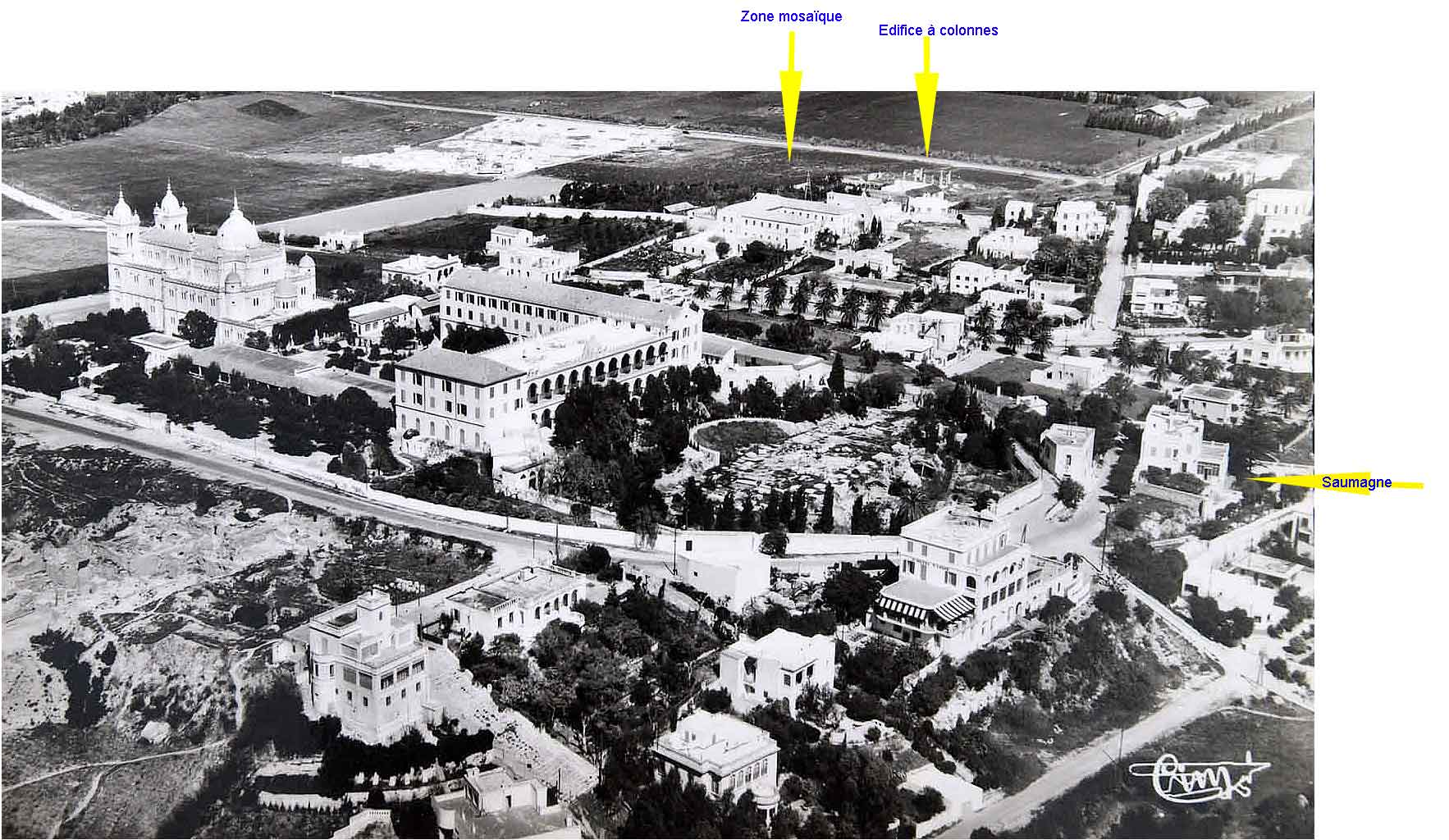
Location of the place where the mosaic was discovered in relation to the Byrsa hill and the columned building.

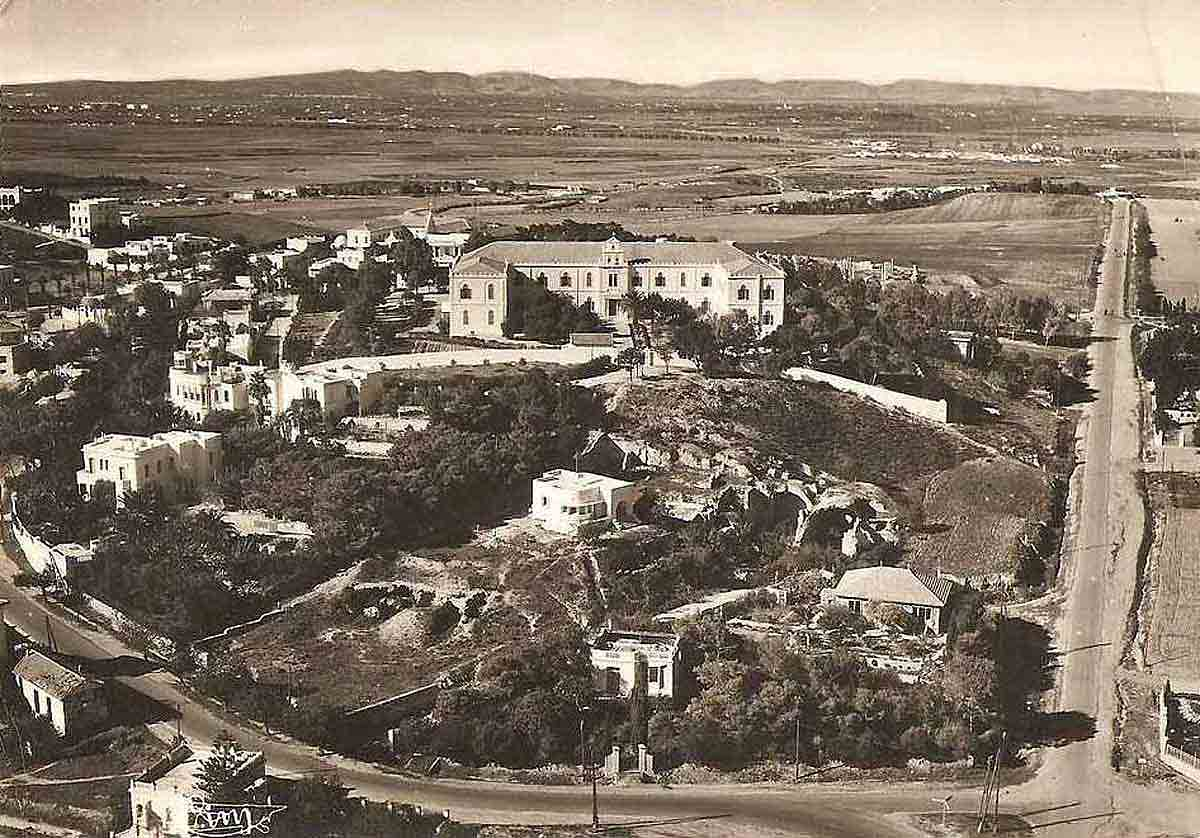
Location of the place where the mosaic was discovered in relation to the Lavigerie Institute of the White Sisters.

== Difficulties in dating ==
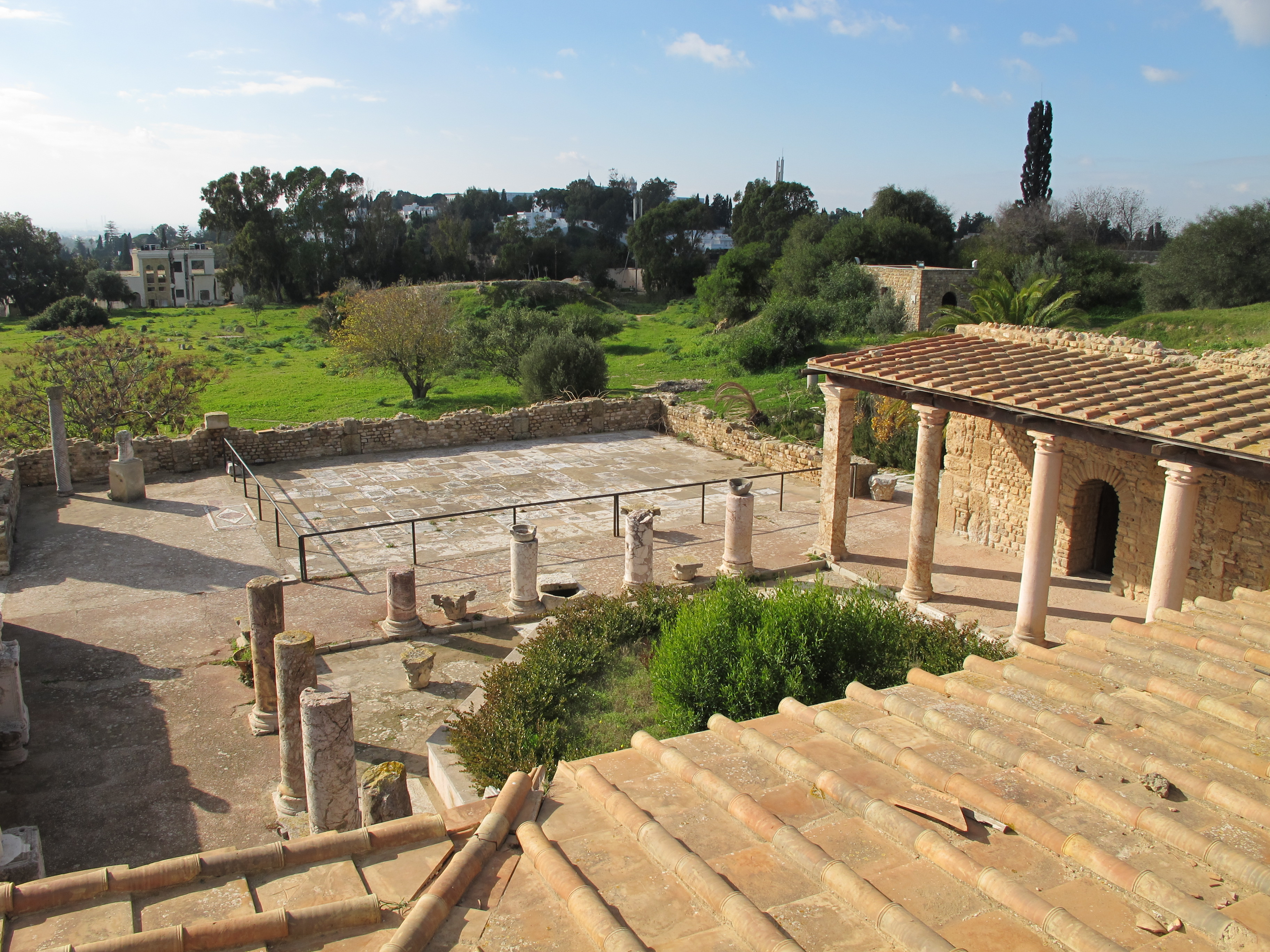
View of the mosaic in its current environment.

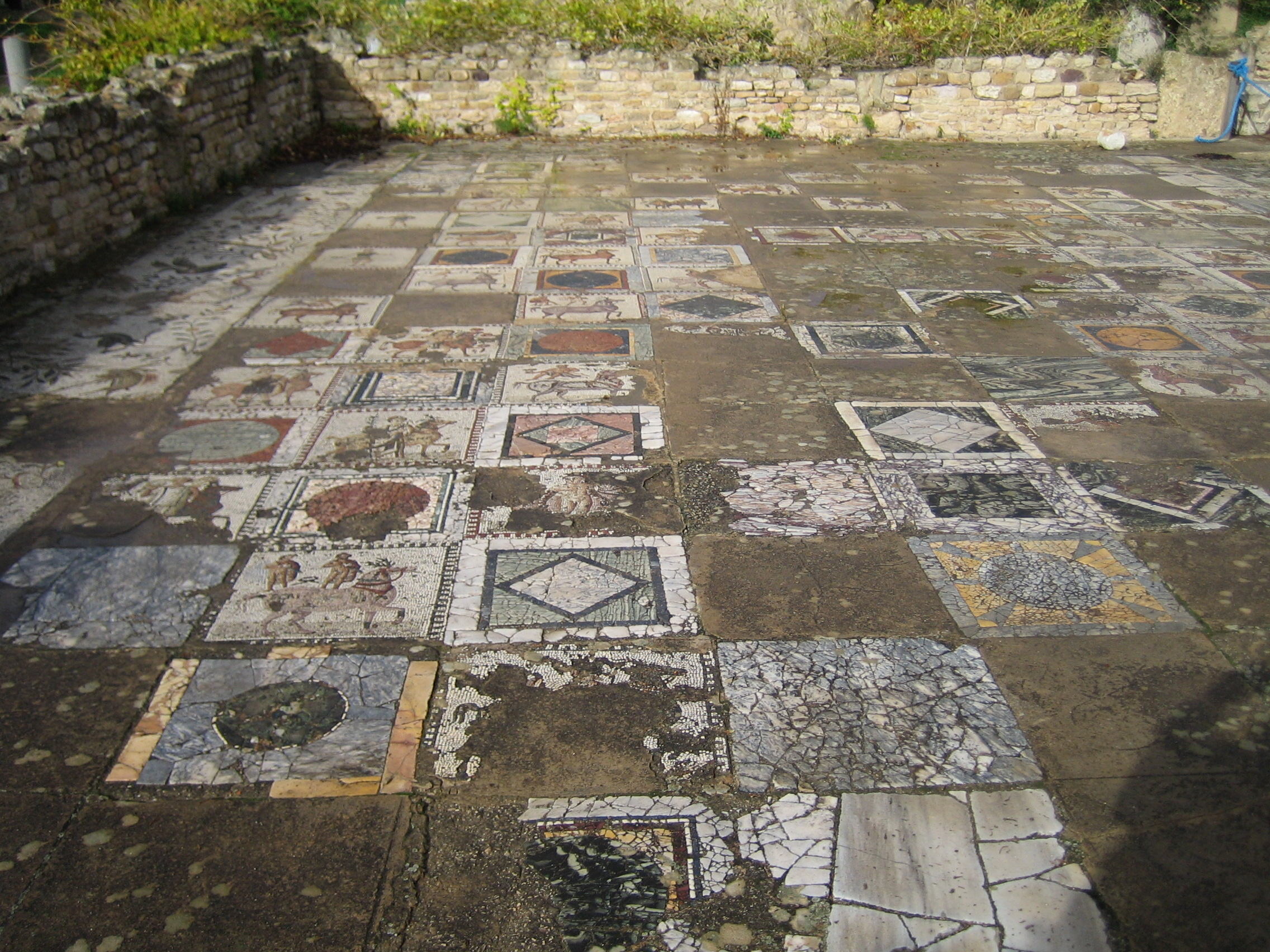
General view of the mosaic reinstalled in the park of the Roman villas.

Due to the urgency of the roadworks, archaeologists were unable to conduct a thorough study of the ruins. The heritage department promptly removed the mosaics and placed them in the antiquarium within the park of the Roman villas. The construction has been dated to the 4th century by Charles-Picard, around the year 300 by Ennaïfer, and to the 5th century by Abdelmajid Ennabli.

Alexandre Lézine and Louis Foucher studied the structure, and the mosaic became the subject of a monograph in 1965 by the Dutch scholar Jan Willem Salomonson, whose work revealed the meaning of the piece. The discovery context is complicated by difficulties in interpreting the nearby building with columns, although Salomonson noted constructions between that structure and the house where the mosaic was found. Several mosaics were discovered simultaneously: the fountain mosaic depicts, in a semicircle, two cupid-like fishermen named Navigius and Naccara, lifting a fishing net; they are in two boats.

Navigius has a tattoo in the middle of his forehead, a type of marking that, according to Salomonson, can be dated to a period ranging from the late 3rd to the mid-4th century. In the background, the scene includes a landscape with waves depicted as zigzags, along with fish and a duck. The work, which shares similarities with a mosaic from Hadrumetum preserved at the Louvre Museum, is dated by Salomonson to 300 AD. The peristyle yielded mosaics featuring amphitheater scenes, framed by braided garlands within hexagonal panels, depicting characters and animals in medallions on the theme of games. The same site also produced fragments of a remarkable hunting scene mosaic, set in a wooded and mountainous landscape, framed by acanthus scrolls and birds. According to Salomonson, this work is considered "of paramount importance within the series [...] of African-origin hunting mosaics".

Their respective locations were studied by Salomonson. The house was named the “House of the Horses” due to the site's primary discovery. It featured a peristyle with a fountain and a grand reception hall, considered the main triclinium of the residence. A second triclinium, adorned with a mosaic of the Seasons, also depicting Venus at her toilette, a Genius, Pan, a Cupid, and servant women, was initially thought to be connected to the residence. However, Salomonson expressed serious doubts about this association, a hypothesis later definitively dismissed by René Rebuffat.

== Description ==
=== General description and materials ===
The mosaic measures 12.12 m by 9.08 m. A 90 cm border, decorated with hunting children, surrounds the chessboard-like mosaic, which consists of 198 squares arranged in 18 rows of 11.

These 60 cm-wide squares alternate between tessellated panels (opus musivum) and panels made of opus sectile. The combination of these two techniques within the same work is highly unusual, though, according to Salomonson, it is linked to the late period of its creation. The mosaic panels, featuring 12 to 18 tesserae per linear decimeter, are made from marble, limestone, and colored glass paste. Among the identified marbles, the only confirmed types are yellow marble from Chemtou and white-pink veined marble, which, according to Lézine, may have originated from Thuburbo Majus.

=== Border ===
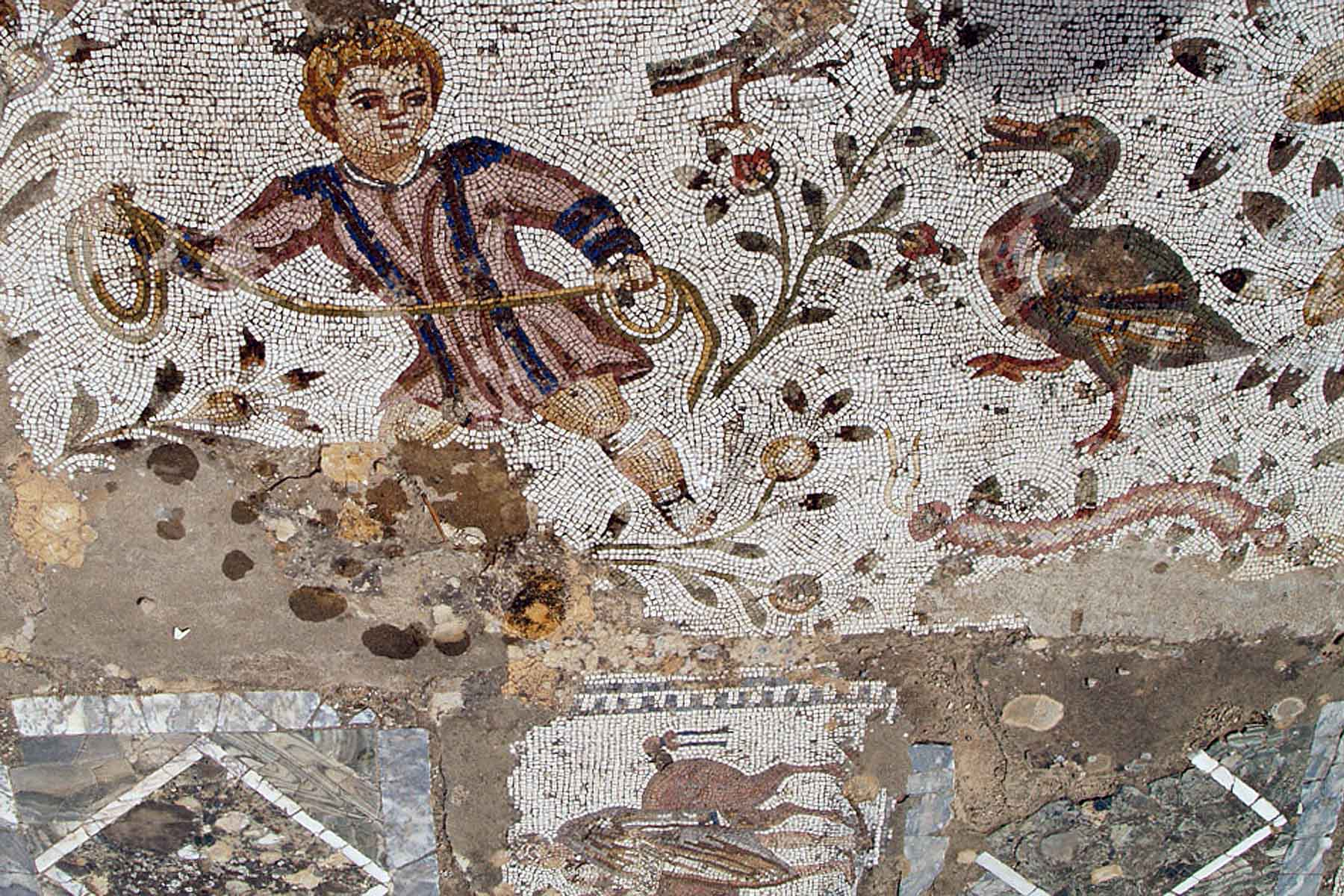
Child as a venator hunter with a lasso and a duck.

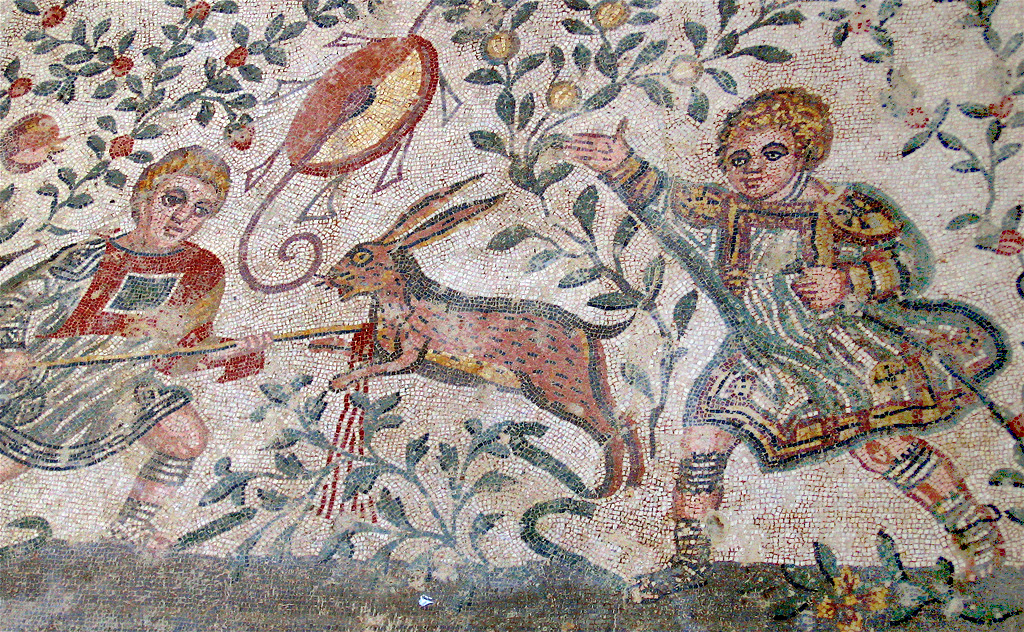
Children of the venator type on a mosaic in the Roman villa of Casale, Sicily.

The outer border consists of three bands featuring various motifs related to the theme of venationes (beast hunts) in the amphitheater, although this theme is not depicted realistically.

Children are portrayed as bestiarii (beast hunters), and harmless animals replace the usual wild beasts. The artist demonstrates "a certain sense of humor and fantasy." The children on the border, wearing protective bandages on their knees and ankles, hunt small animals such as ducks, geese, small panthers, jerboas, and cats, while some attempt to lasso birds. Others carry short hunting javelins. Five complete child figures have been preserved, along with four partial ones.

Their round faces are quite similar, matching "a type of childlike physiognomy widely represented in Roman art from the last quarter of the 3rd century to the early 4th century AD." This style of representation can also be found in the Casale mosaic. The landscape features ears of wheat, flowers, fruits, baskets, birds, and hares. Partially preserved winged Cupids appear, facing an antelope.

=== Geometric panels ===
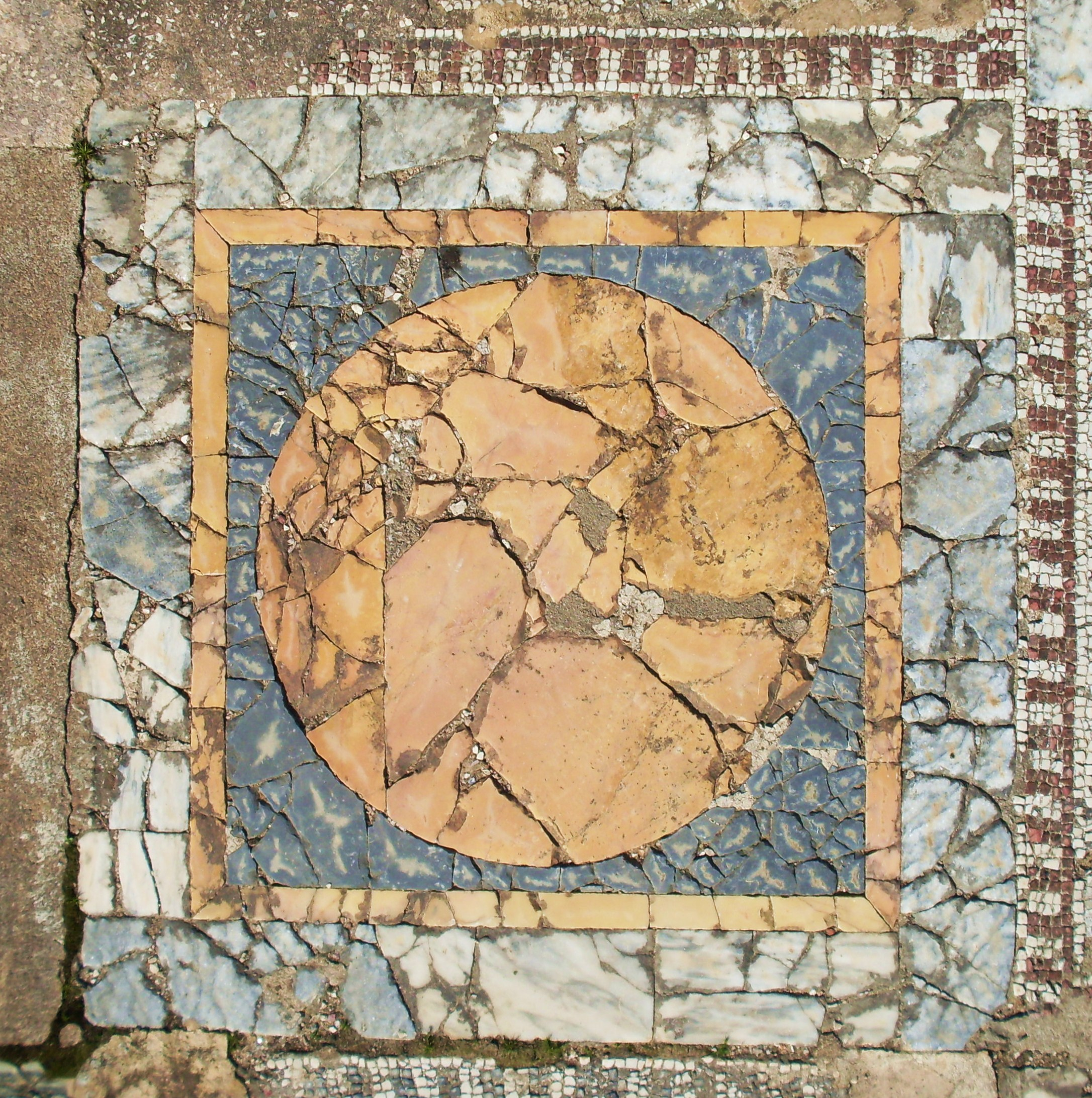
Opus sectile panel.

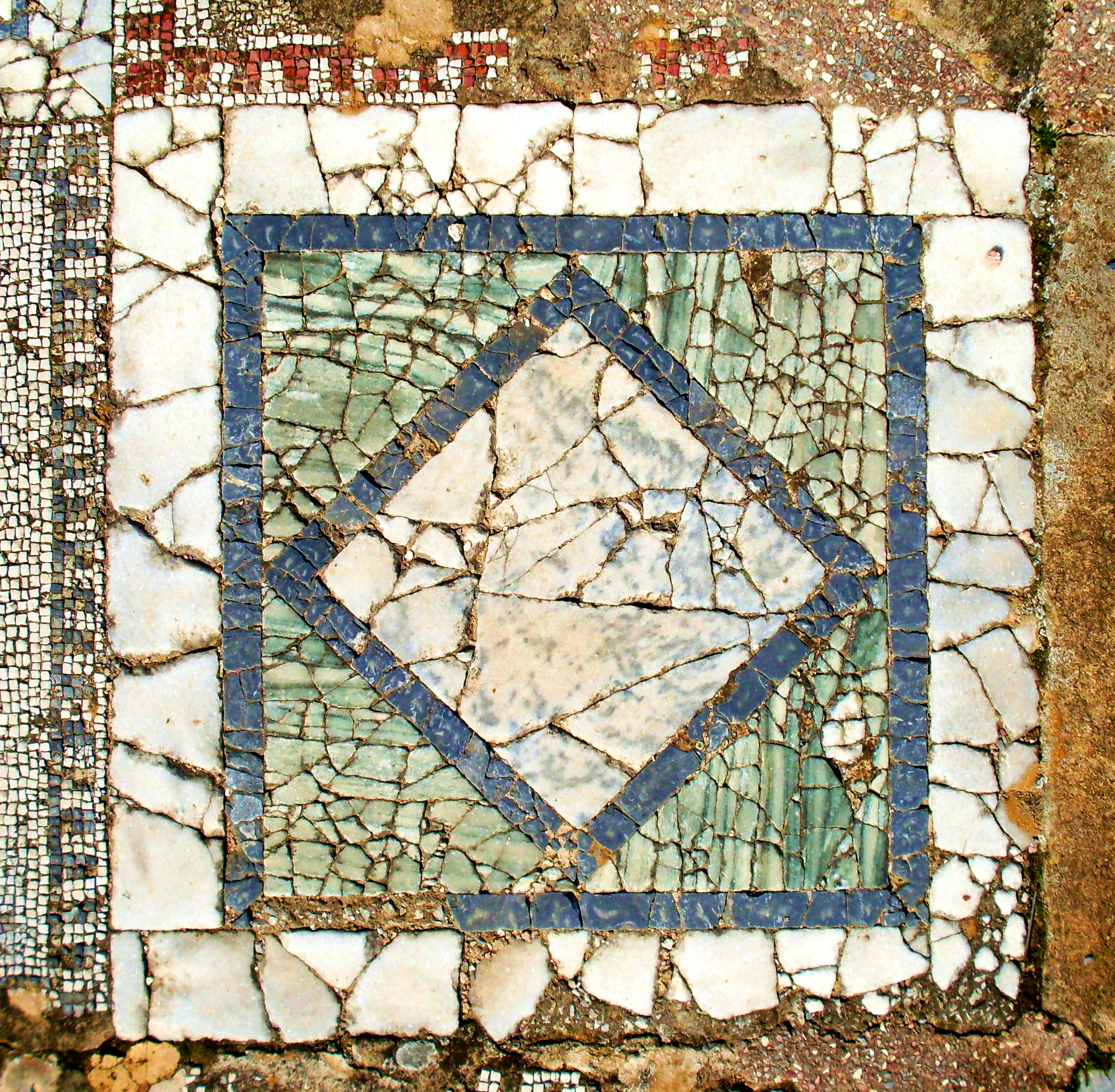
Opus sectile panel.

The opus sectile panels are made of thin slabs of marble in various colors and shapes.

This technique was widely used during the Late Roman Empire, both in Africa and in other regions of the Roman Empire. According to Salomonson, three geometric patterns are present in these panels: "inscribed tiles whose sides are parallel to the frame," "tilted squares with sides aligned to the diagonals," and "inscribed circles." These panels were restored in antiquity, which radically altered their original appearance.

=== Figurative panels ===
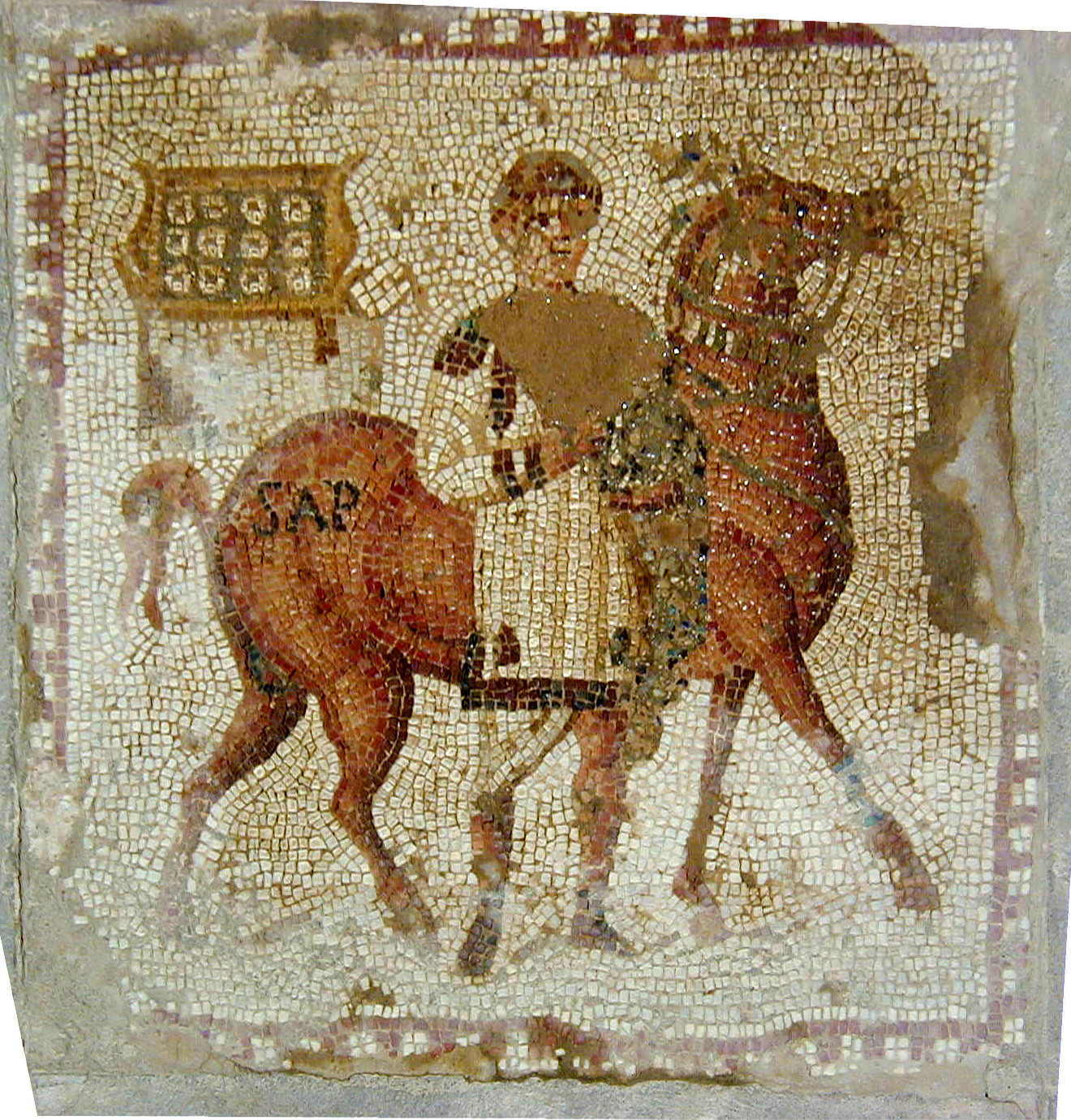
Polystephanus medallion.

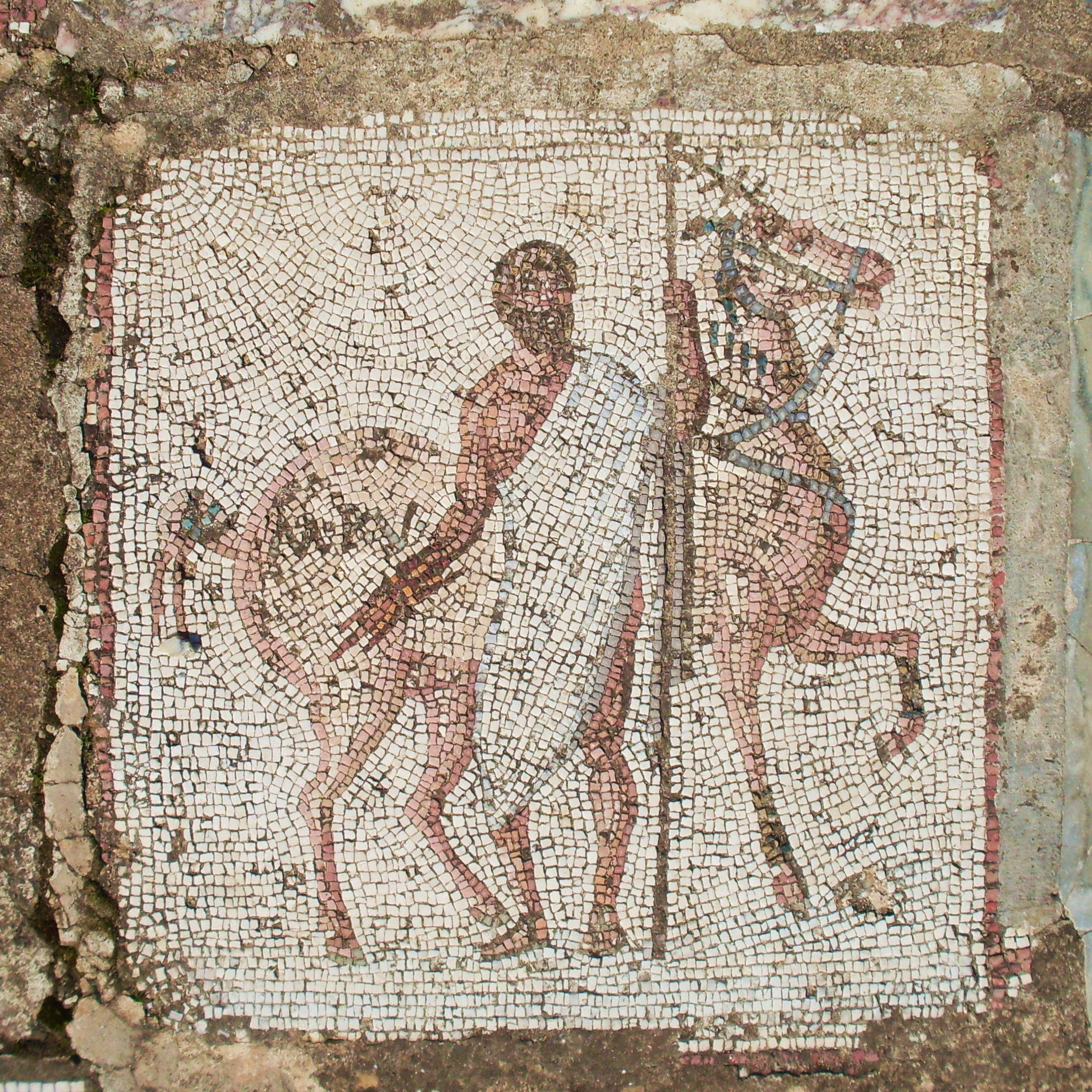
Medallion with a representation of Jupiter. (Note: Salomonson 1965, p. 103)

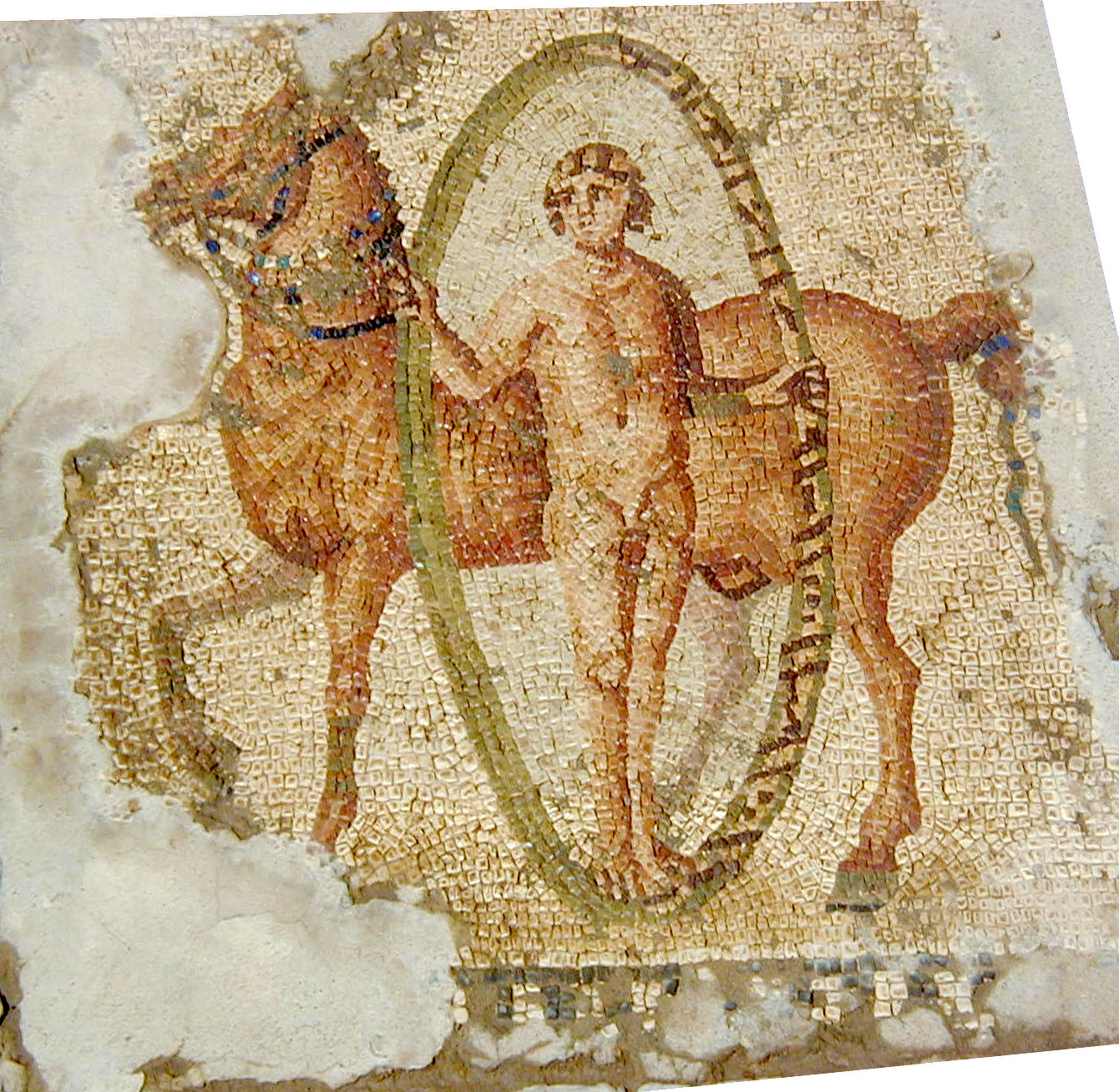
Medallion with a horse and a personification of infinite time in a large hoop. (Note: Salomonson 1965, p. 105)

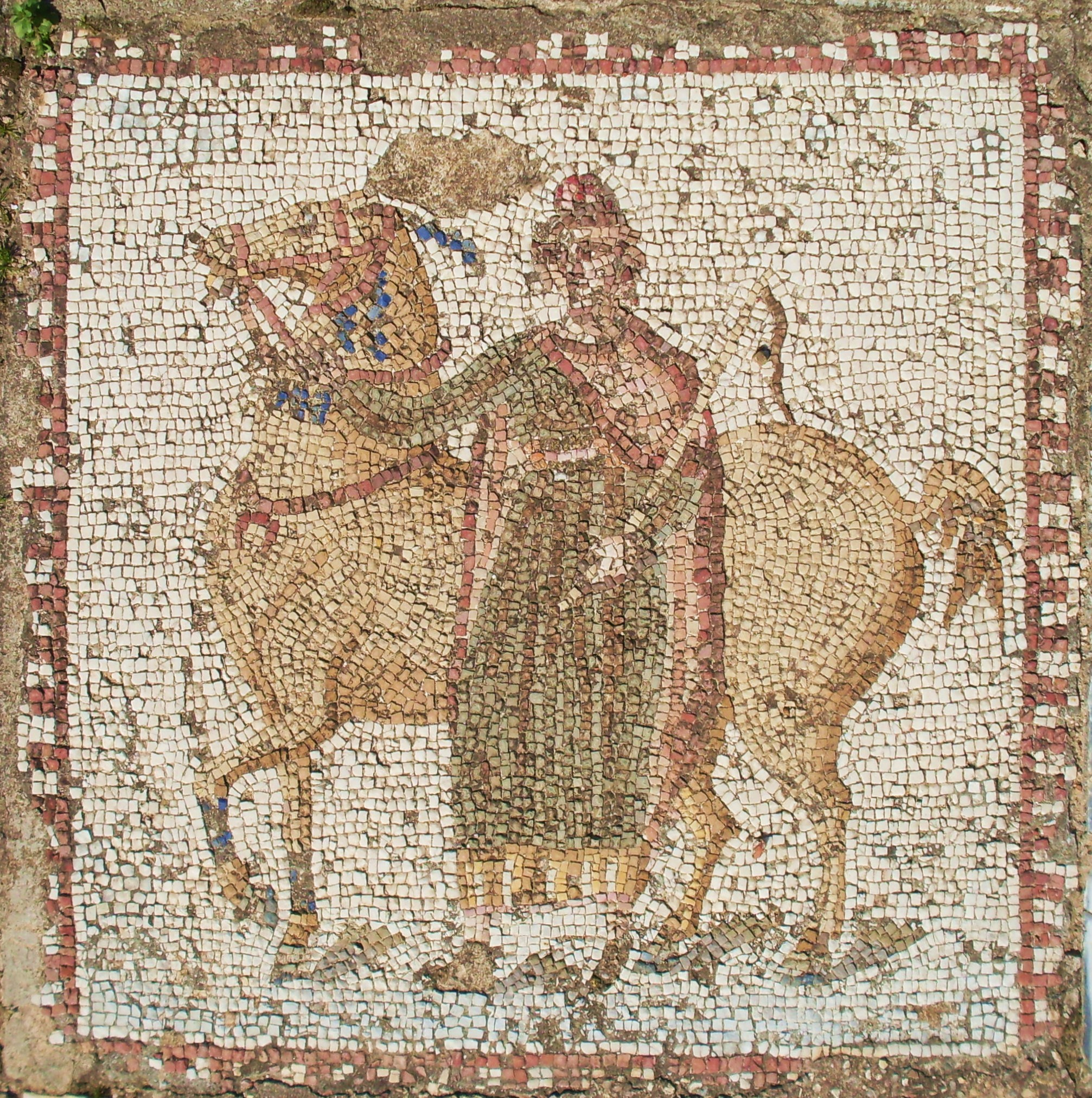
Mosaic panel with a representation of Pelops. (Note: Salomonson 1965, p. 106)

The mosaic panels originally numbered 90, of which 62 have been partially or entirely preserved. Ennaïfer and Beschaouch mention 61 fully or partially preserved figurative panels. Following Salomonson, Beschaouch estimates the total number of mosaic panels at 98, with one hundred panels composed of opus sectile marble slabs.

The mosaic panels are very fine and of high quality, with some described as "authentic masterpieces" by Mohamed Yacoub. Darmon suggests that different artisans worked on different sections, with some executing the victorious horses and others handling the mythological scenes, which were crafted using very small tesserae.

The mosaic also exhibits ancient repairs using opus sectile or plain, undecorated marble.

The theme of circus games dominates the opus musivum panels of the artwork, a motif widely used in Africa in both public and private spaces. Most panels depict racehorses, while a few portray figures associated with the circus, all enclosed within a serrated frame.

All secondary representations in the panels aim to help the viewer identify the horse’s name through a rebus system, though Darmon notes that "the reading is never unambiguous."

==== Equine representations ====
Arranged in five columns, the panels nearly all depict racehorses prepared for a circus race, wearing a collar inscribed with the full or abbreviated name of the owner. Fifty-six panels display portraits of Barb breed horses, while five depict sparsores (water-sprinklers) or aurigae (charioteers). The horses are positioned facing left or right, almost all in a similar stance—head turned back, right foreleg raised—and are harnessed, plumed, ribboned, and adorned with phalerae collars.

Sometimes, the owner's name appears on the horse’s rump or shoulder, with abbreviations reminiscent of Latin epigraphy. The horses' names are inferred from the overall composition of the panel in a sort of rebus, as identified by Salomonson. However, the study of these panels has not yielded names for every horse, and some identifications remain controversial. A particularly debated panel features a table with twelve circles, leading to various interpretations. The horse's flank bears the inscription "SAP," while a young man stands in front of the steed.

Salomonson declines to interpret the panel. The most accepted analysis is that of Claude Nicolet, who suggests that the twelve circles represent a number of victories, an interpretation supported by Beschaouch as the only satisfactory explanation, allowing the horse to be named Polystefanus (literally "crowned multiple times" in Greek). The horse panels are further embellished with one or two human figures, and in some cases, a complete scene accompanies the horse.

The decorations related to horses are categorized into six groups by Charles-Picard: divinities, personifications, mythological scenes, daily life, games, and other characters unrelated to horses. Salomonson groups them into four categories: the divine world, myths, professions, and a final group including elements that do not fit into the first three. According to Ennaïfer, the complementary scenes represent "the great originality of this document."

Among the unclassifiable panels, one depicts a farewell scene: a young man carrying luggage is leaving a bearded man seated on a rock. Even the author of the first monograph on the subject acknowledges the difficulty of identifying this episode.

==== Representations of characters ====
===== Divine representations and personifications =====
Among the relatively well-preserved representations of deities, one panel depicts Jupiter with his attributes (scepter and lightning bolt) with a horse named M.P.V. in the background. Another portrays Neptune holding a trident, in front of a horse belonging to a man named Simpli. A third panel possibly represents the god Mars.

Other panels include representations of Victoria, Genius, Pan, and Attis. Additionally, there is a personification of Carthage and a personification of absolute time, described as "without beginning or end, unfolding eternally with the movement of celestial bodies," depicted as a young man holding a hoop with zodiac signs.

===== Myths and legends =====
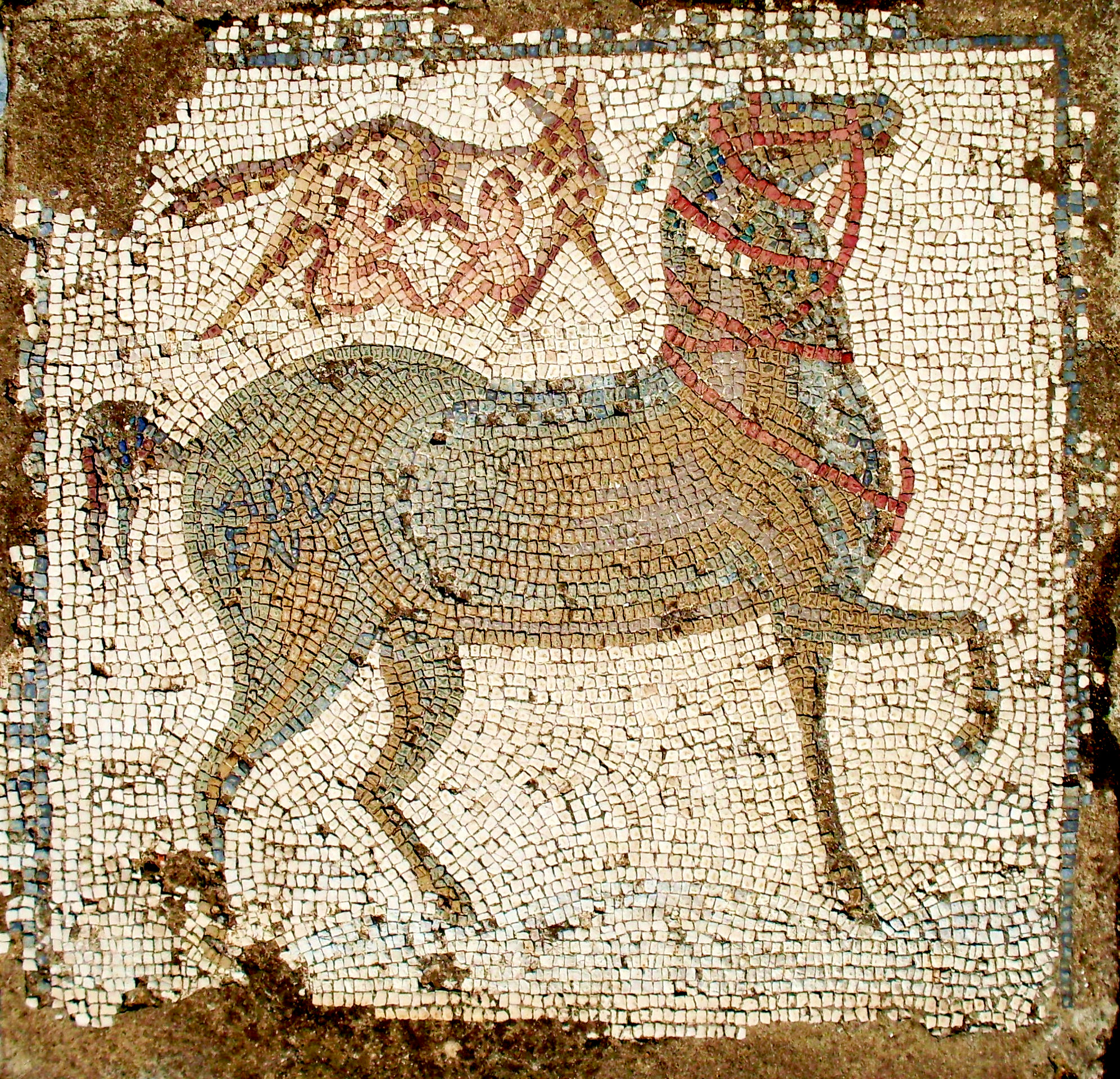
Mosaic panel with a horse and a she-wolf under which there are two children, possibly the twins Romulus and Remus.

One panel possibly represents the legend of the twins Romulus and Remus accompanied by the Roman she-wolf, with a gray horse in the foreground inscribed ADVEN. Another panel depicts Aeneas fleeing Troy with his father Anchises, with a horse in the background named ALAFI.

The myth of Daedalus and Icarus appears on two panels: one shows Icarus taking flight, leading to his fall, while the other portrays Daedalus in his workshop, working on a model of the cow intended for Pasiphaë.

Four panels are identified by Salomonson as linked to the myth of Hercules: one depicting his fight against Geryon, another featuring the Ceryneian Hind. A third panel shows Hercules on a rock holding a cup and a club, while the last, partially preserved, depicts Hercules drunk with a satyr. According to Darmon, the panel of Hercules on a rock should instead be interpreted as the Cyclops Polyphemus, as the figure has a third eye on the forehead. The absence of Odysseus does not contradict this identification, as representations of the Cyclops alone were common. (Note: Salomonson 1965, p. 109)

The mosaic also includes a representation of Danaë receiving Jupiter's golden rain, as well as a scene of Lycurgus cutting a vine, after Bacchus transformed the Maenad Ambrosia. A fragmentary panel depicts Achilles being dipped into the Styx.

Some heavily damaged panels have been identified by specific details. For instance, Orpheus is recognized by his Phrygian cap and lyre. The myth of the abduction of the Argonaut Hylas belongs to this category, as does a panel showing Narcissus gazing at his reflection. Another panel features a helmeted and armed Amazon.

Other panels remain difficult to identify despite being in good condition. For instance, Salomonson hesitates between interpreting one battle scene as Eteocles and Polynices or the Dioscuri. Another panel depicts a figure wearing a Phrygian cap and holding a whip, likely Pelops, while another may represent Odysseus. Sometimes, identification is challenging due to the lack of specific attributes.

One of the most detailed representations includes, in the background as secondary characters, a woman on a rock and two Tritons with raised arms. According to Salomonson, this scene illustrates Sappho’s “Leucadian Leap,” where she attempts to forget her love for Phaon. However, Darmon proposes that it depicts Ino, as the female figure is holding a baby, Melicertes, representing Ino's leap into the sea to escape Hera’s wrath.

One panel features a rare depiction of the myth of Ninos, showing him reclining on his bed, tormented by love for Semiramis. A mosaic from Antioch also represents the same theme.

===== Representations of daily life scenes =====
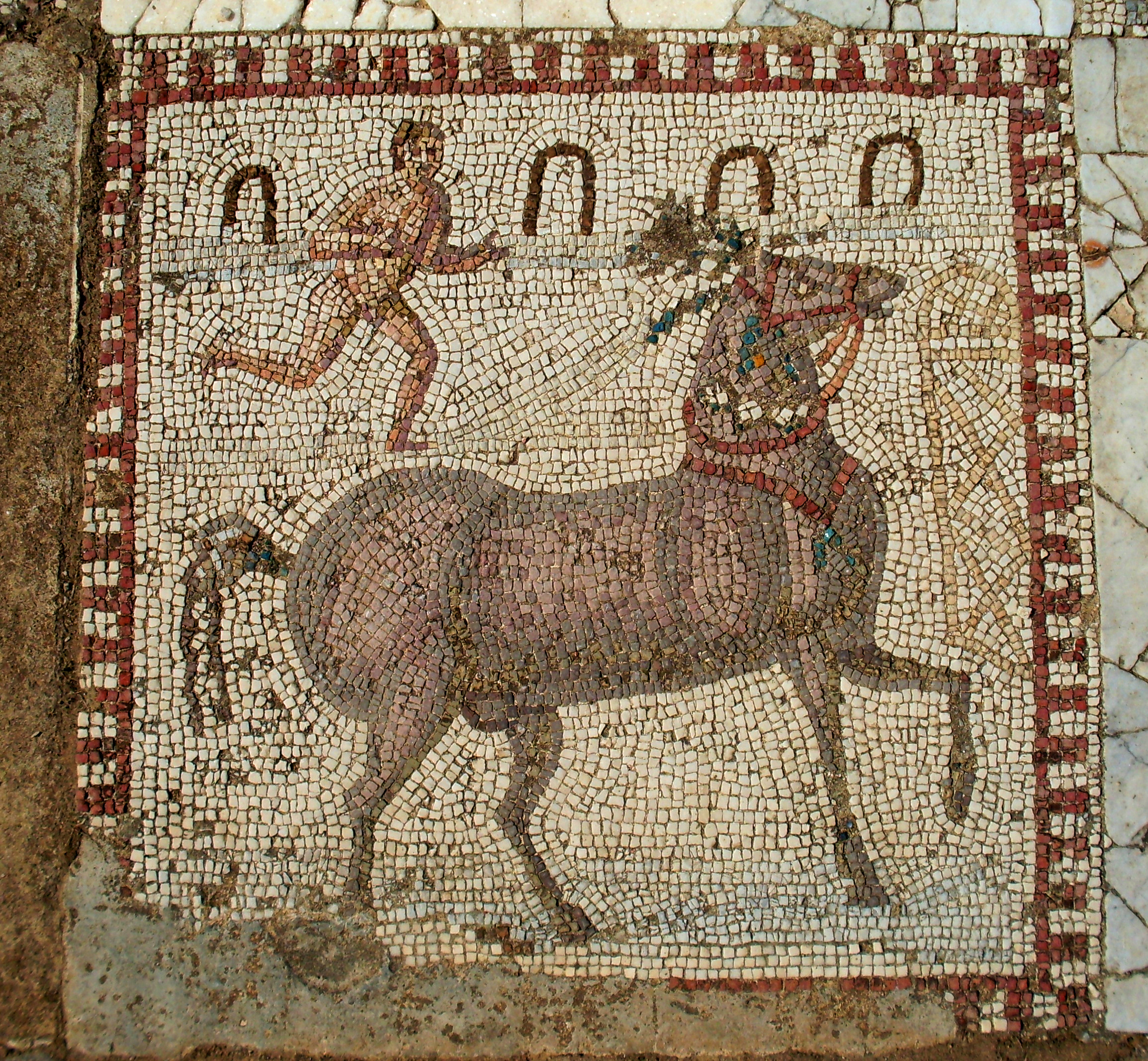
Medallion from the mosaic with a horse, a runner, and the arches of a palisade. (Note: Salomonson 1965, p. 114)

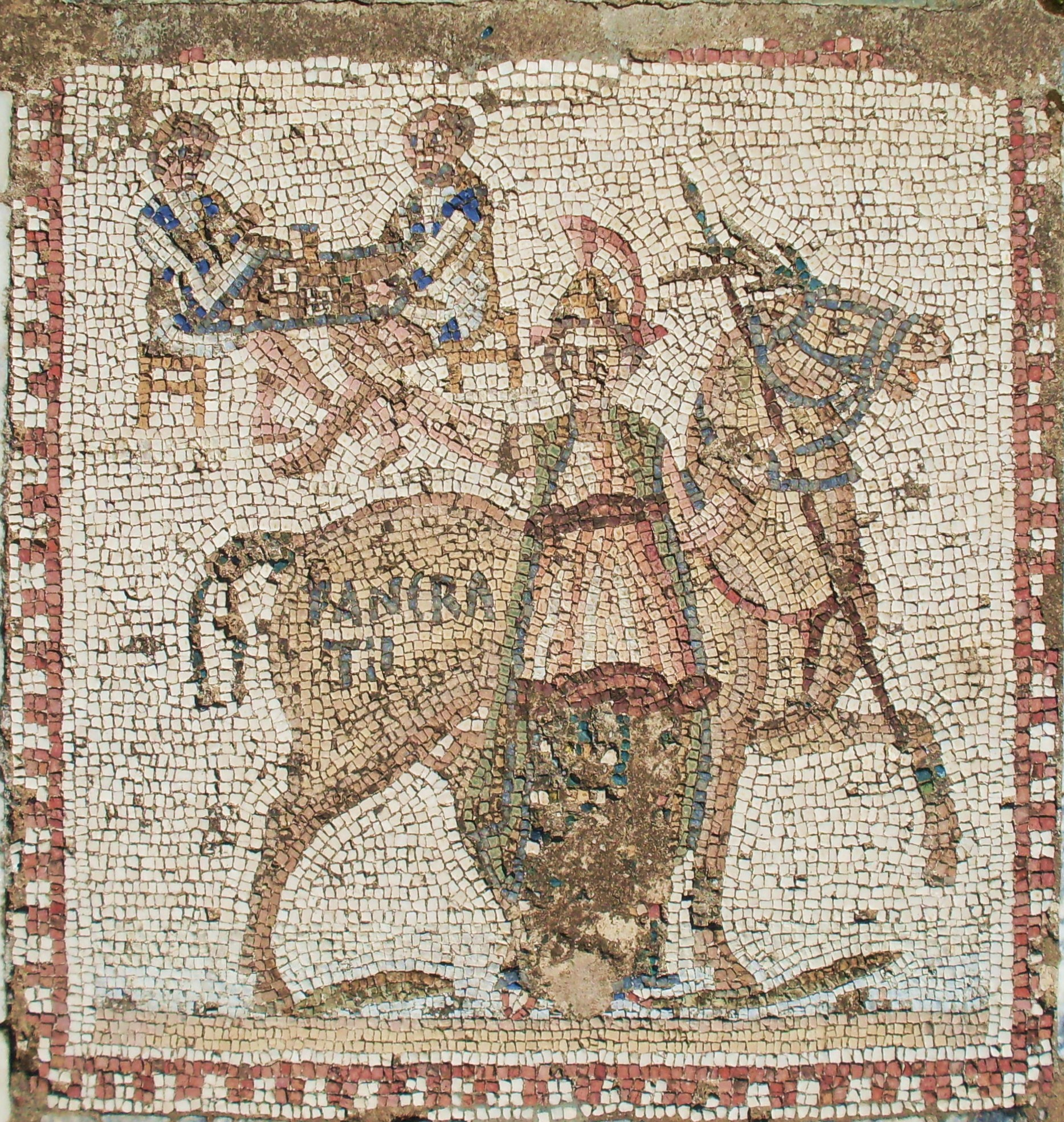
Horse with a divinity, probably Minerva, and two men playing in the background; note the name inscribed on the horse's rump. (Note: Salomonson 1965, pp. 106–107)

Several panels depict hunting scenes: in one, a hunter holding a staff and carrying a net on his left shoulder is accompanied by a dog. Another panel shows a hunter chasing a hare with the help of a greyhound. The horse in this scene is named SILVI. Bird hunting is featured in two panels: one shows a hunter aiming his staff at a tree, where a bird, now lost, likely perched. The second scene displays a bird-catcher’s equipment placed on a tree, including lime twigs and a cage, with a falcon tied to it.

A damaged panel features a shepherd carrying a lamb on his shoulders.

Certain sports activities are also depicted: there is a detailed representation of a track runner in the background, along with hoops. The scene takes place in a circus, as in front of the horse stands one of the carceres, the starting gates for races. Other panels are damaged, such as one depicting a pugilist and an athlete, both crowned. Another panel shows a young man dressed only in typical sports shorts, carrying a stick with sacks or baskets of roses at its ends on his shoulder. According to Salomonson, this is an Alexandrian motif. The same author suggests that the scene may have a religious purpose, connected to a rose festival described by Philostratus, linked to funerary cults but also featuring popular ceremonies, including a race of rose-bearers.

Artistic activities are also depicted in damaged panels: one figure, wearing a pallium, is shown reading a scroll, possibly an orator or a poet, according to Salomonson. Another panel features a figure who could be either a comic poet or an actor, with two theater masks in the background.

Some panels have proven difficult to interpret, such as the Polystephanus panel: it depicts a young man in a tunic, wearing a cloak over his arm and holding an unidentifiable object, as the mosaic is damaged in that area. Salomonson believes this represents a specific profession, given the apron covering the figure’s knee. Another panel depicts two dancers wearing Phrygian clothing—pants, a Phrygian cap, and a tunic—one of whom is holding a torch. Salomonson cautiously suggests that this scene may be linked to a religious festival honoring Attis.

A fragmentary panel may depict an augury scene, featuring a cage containing a hen and a staff that could be an augural rod. Another panel portrays a boat being hauled along a river.

A medallion features, in the background, a character lying on a bed, while the horse bears the inscription ANNI-MA. Another medallion depicts two dice players, with a game table resting on their laps. On the table, one can see two dice, discs, and a dice cup. The horse behind Minerva is named PANCRATII. The cult of Minerva was significant in Skiron, where games of chance were practiced. According to Darmon, the depiction of the dice players is not just an everyday scene but carries a symbolic meaning. A mosaic from El Jem, housed in the National Bardo Museum, also depicts dice players and was part of a xenia (ξενία, hospitality) mosaic, which included still lifes and representations of the four seasons. The image of the dice players, as noted by the same author, serves to symbolize Aeon, the personification of eternity, in reference to a fragment from Heraclitus.

Eight or nine medallions depict only characters, particularly victorious charioteers (four, according to Jean-Paul Thuillier) on one of the shorter sides, at the head of the mosaic, with only one being well preserved. On the longer sides, there are four sparsores, each wearing different colors, representing the various circus factions. The fact that they are depicted in entire panels alongside the charioteers suggests that their role was not merely subordinate, but possibly that of race officials, according to Charles-Picard. He interprets the object held by a sparsor as a megaphone. However, Salomonson disagrees, identifying it instead as a vessel, arguing that the small amphorae or jugs they carried were a distinguishing mark of their specific function. The positive depiction of the sparsores might be attributed to the dangers they faced in circus games, as they were often positioned in hazardous spots on the track to sprinkle water on the horses' muzzles.

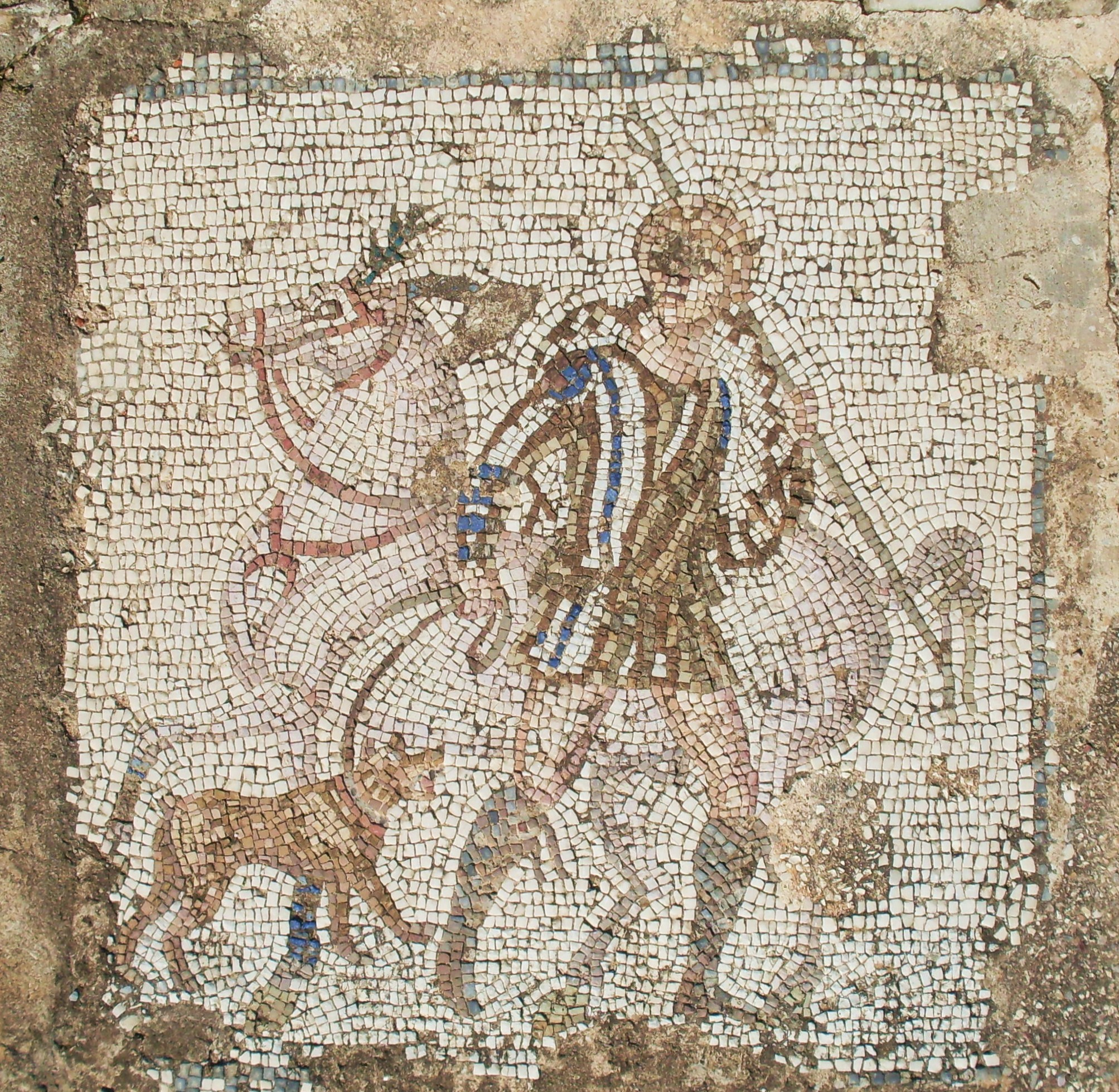
Hunting scene.

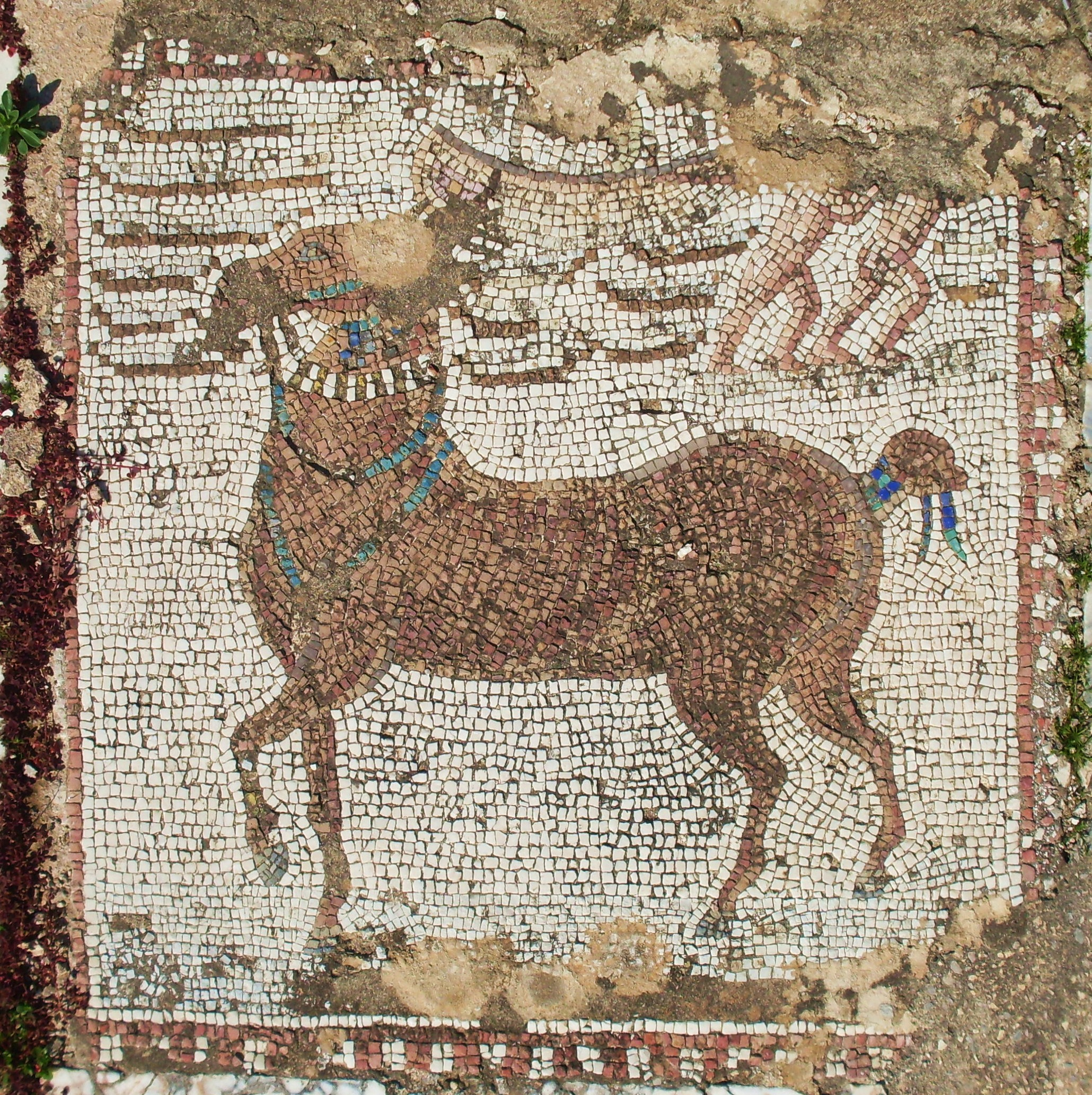
Ship hauling scene. (Note: Salomonson 1965, pp. 115–116)

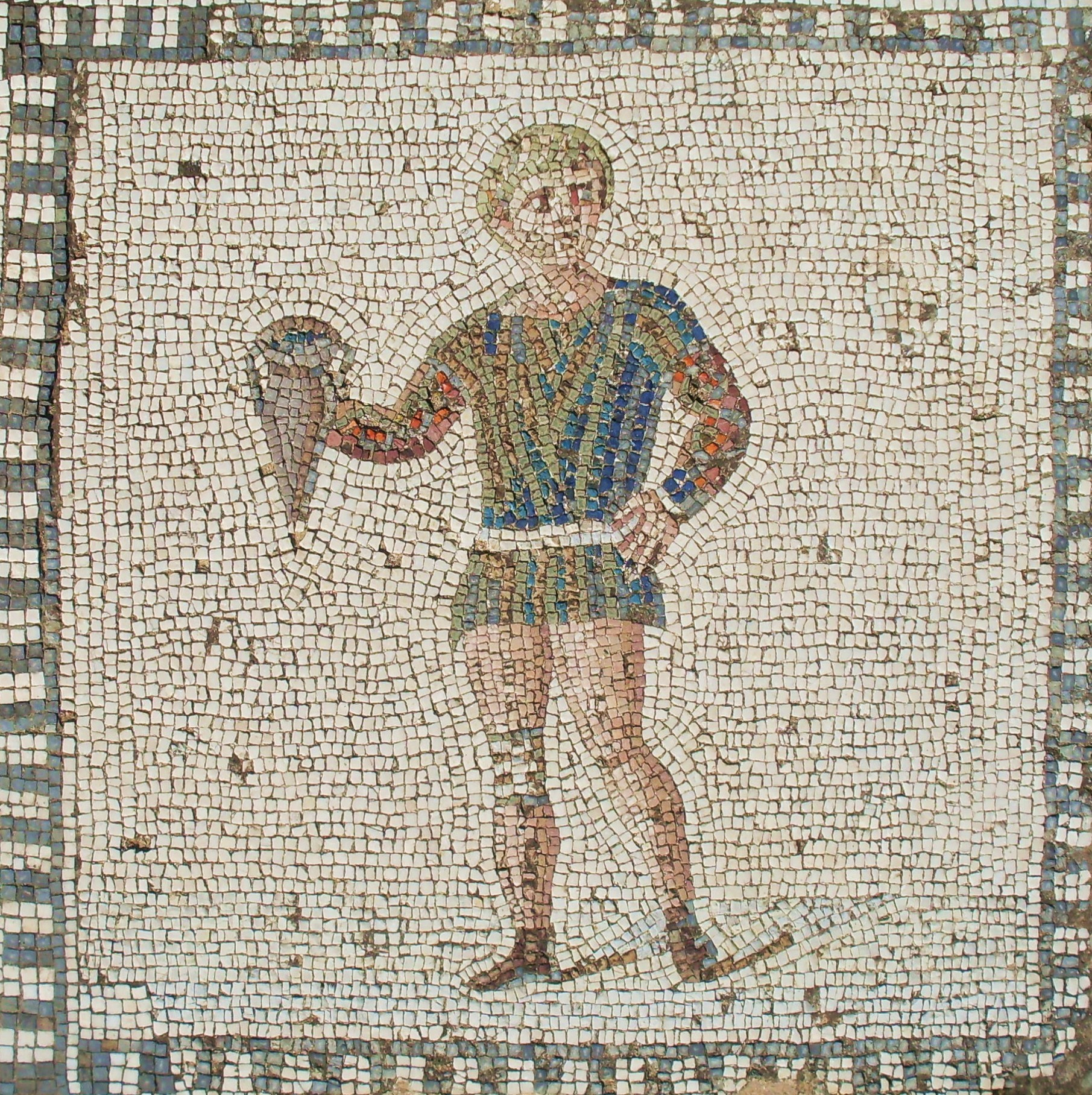
Sparsor (herdsman) with a jug in his hand.

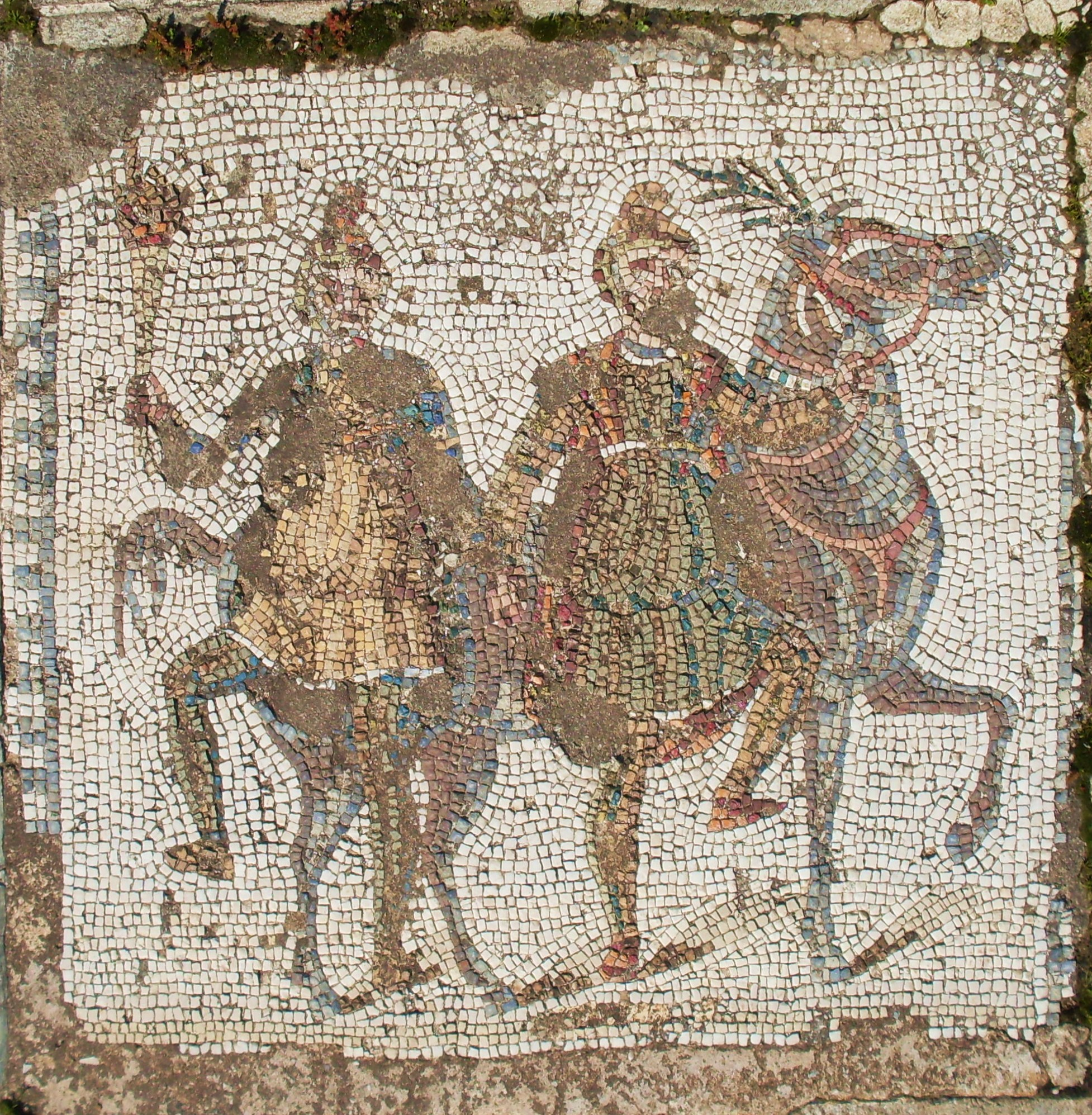
Sign with two dancers dressed in Phrygian fashion. (Note: Salomonson 1965, p. 104)

== Interpretation ==
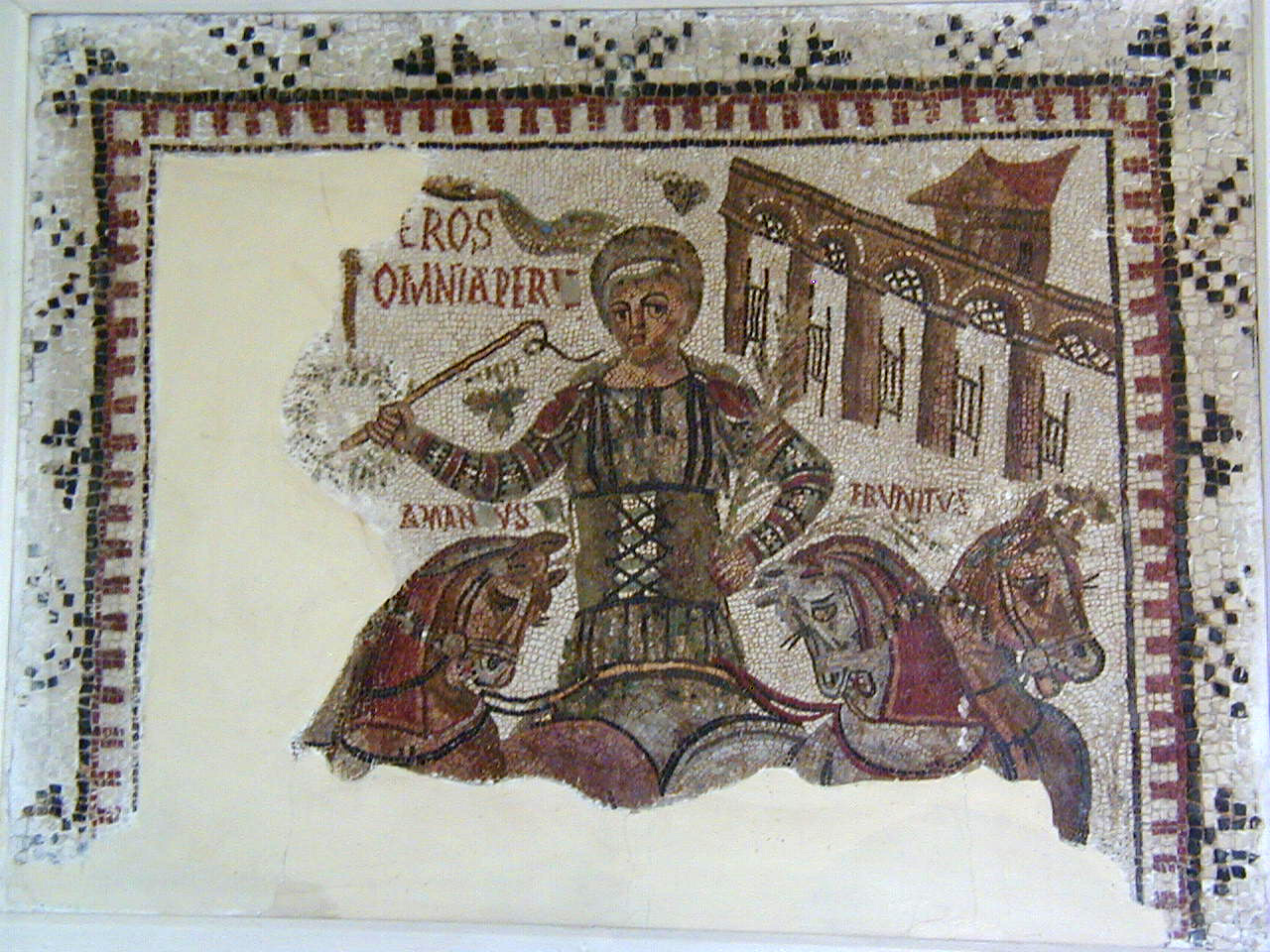
Mosaic known as the Charioteer Victorious, Dougga, 4th century, kept at the National Bardo Museum: note the names of the horses.

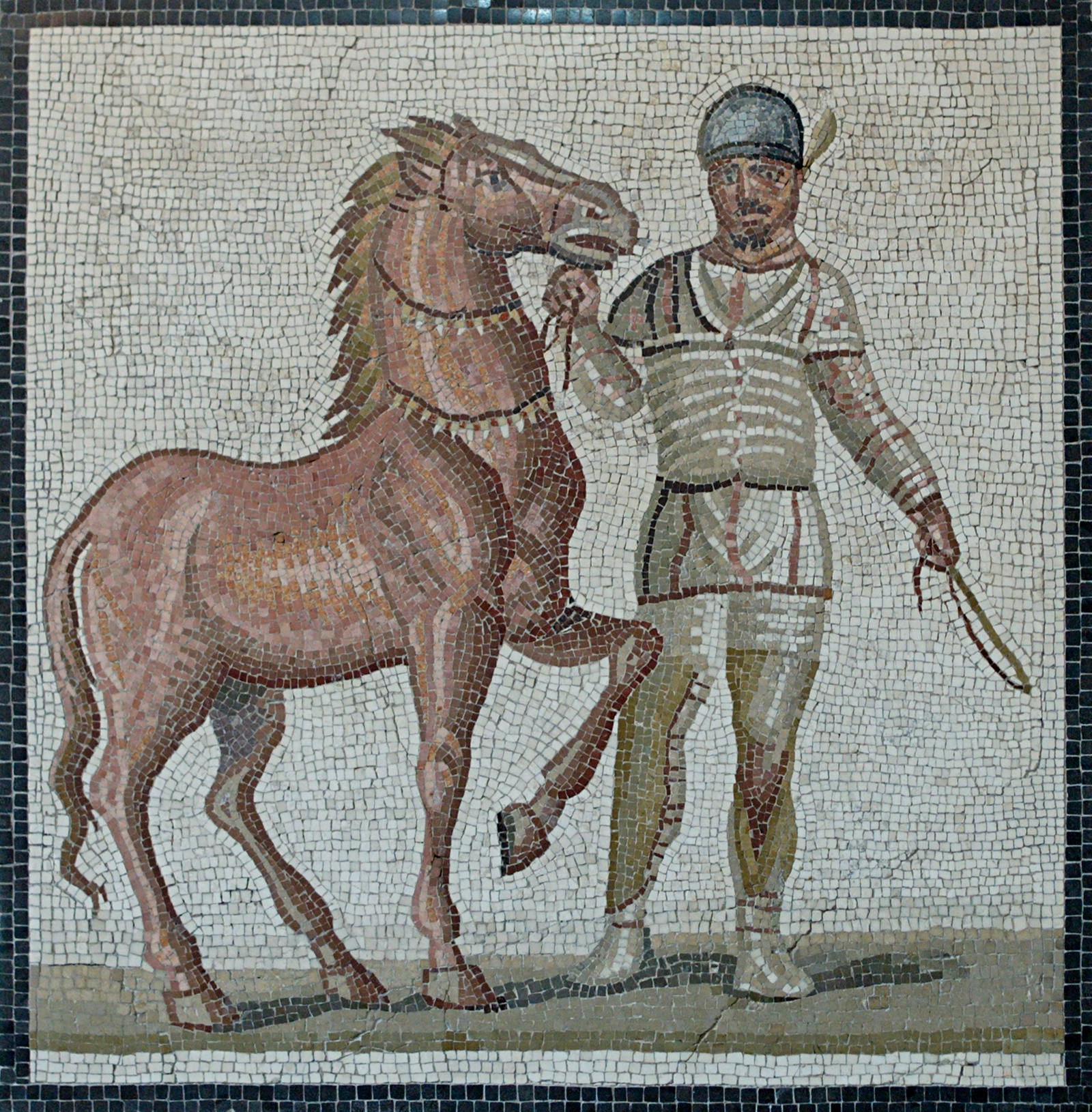
Pavement mosaic of the charioteer in the white tunic, representing one of the four factions of the circus, Villa of the Severi at Baccano (16 miles from the Via Appia), first half of the third century BC, preserved in the National Roman Museum (Palazzo Massimo alle Terme) in Rome: note the attitude of the horse, very similar to that of the horses on the mosaic of Carthage.

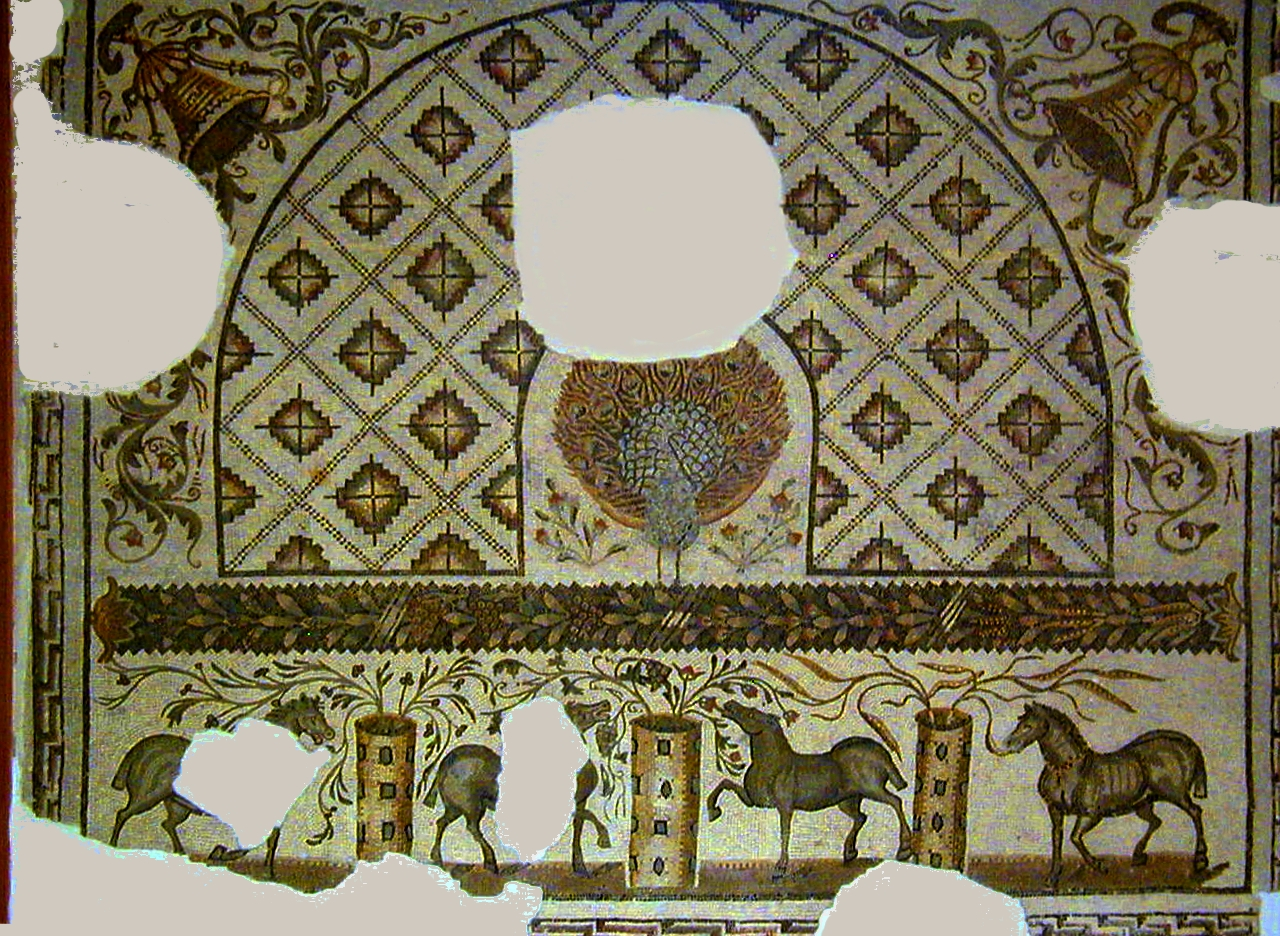
Peacock spreading its tail, horses of the four circus factions and prize cylinders, Carthage, 4th century BC, National Bardo Museum: this mosaic is undoubtedly a commemoration of a victory, and promoted the master of the house.

=== A complex work ===
The emblemata vary in quality, as they were created by multiple artisans, yet the overall composition remains coherent and has been dated to the early 4th century by Charles-Picard.

Among the motifs used, the "irregular scattering" pattern in the border is associated with a Hellenistic aesthetic. The hunter children motif, on the other hand, represents a reinterpretation of the Alexandrian theme of fishing cupids.

Initially, the mosaic was thought to represent a festival calendar. But this theory was quickly dismissed by Salomonson, who instead proposed that each emblema functions as a rebus puzzle, allowing viewers to guess the name of a racehorse. This use of riddles is, as of today, unique, according to Ennabli. However, some of the images in the mosaic remain undeciphered.

=== A representation of the role of horse racing in society ===
The mosaic highlights the importance of chariot racing among the elite of Late Antiquity.

In ancient Rome, the practice of naming racehorses was widespread and appeared on various media. These names were frequently inscribed on African mosaics, as well as on objects of different forms and materials, and in epigraphic documents. Horse names were generally common throughout the Roman Empire, with the exception of those bearing names such as IUBA or MASSINISSA. The names of racehorses in ancient Rome can be broadly classified into five categories:

- Physical or psychological traits;
- Mythological references;
- Professions or activities;
- Animal names;
- Geographical connections.

These five naming categories, identified through epigraphic sources, are all represented in the Carthage mosaic. According to Salomonson, the mosaic features "visual wordplay," where each image contains a figurative clue hinting at a horse’s name. This mosaic is highly original, as "no exact parallel can be cited."

=== Debated purpose ===
The owner’s intent may have been commemorative, similar to the animal catalog mosaics found in amphitheaters, which were meant to memorialize past games. The number of horses depicted in the mosaic might correspond to a specific group that participated in circus races. Ennabli suggests that the mosaic commemorates a race held in the Carthage circus. This type of representation was common in the 3rd and 4th centuries. It is also possible that the mosaic celebrates an event that took place in the imperial capital, as epigraphic inscriptions discovered in Rome could potentially be linked to the Carthaginian rebuses.

The color of the horses' collars indicated the team (factio) to which they belonged. Some jubilatores (cheerers or celebrants) also wore colored tunics. The factions depicted in the mosaic are the Blues and the Reds, which were politically associated with conservative and aristocratic ideals. The mosaic is likely connected to the columned building where another mosaic dedicated to the Blue faction was discovered.

Describing the racehorse teams through the game allowed the master of the house to present them in a more engaging manner, avoiding the monotony of a simple list while also showcasing his refinement and erudition. Guests entering the main room (œcus) were expected to find a topic for discussion. However, decoding the rebuses required a high level of knowledge: while some seemingly simple panels allowed for multiple interpretations, others were considerably more complex. The mosaic in the reception hall sparked scholarly debates, known as "table questions," providing an opportunity for guests to assert themselves as mousikoi andres (aesthetes).

Yacoub challenges previous interpretations, proposing that the villa likely belonged to a wealthy aristocrat from the early 4th century. The building’s size suggests the owner’s preference for luxury, while the quality of the craftsmanship indicates significant expenditures and a high level of erudition, particularly evident in the guessing game involving the names of the horses.

=== A repertoire that may have set a precedent ===
The African repertoire that emerged in the 2nd and 3rd centuries served as a source of inspiration, particularly during Late Antiquity, as motifs were transferred from Africa to Sicily. According to Ennaïfer, the composition, enriched by the catalog of horses and the border featuring a frieze of child hunters, represents a "rich repertoire of models that influenced several artists," including, most likely, those who worked on the Villa of Piazza Armerina, which Salomonson dates to the period 310–375.

The mosaic, through the "exceptional variety of representations attached to the racehorses, provides an astonishing insight into the vast thematic repertoire available to the mosaic workshops of Proconsular Africa."

== See also ==
- Mosaic
- Roman mosaic
- Villa Romana del Casale

== Bibliography ==
- Beschaouch, Azedine (1996). "Encore « la mosaïque des chevaux » de Carthage : à propos de Polystephanus, le coursier aux multiples victoires" [Again, the “mosaic of horses” of Carthage: about Polystephanus, the steed of many victories]. CRAI (in French). 140 (4): 1315–1320. doi:10.3406/crai.1996.15688.
- Beschaouch, Azedine; Nicolet, Claude (1991). "Nouvelles observations sur la « Mosaïque des chevaux » et son édifice à Carthage" [New observations on the “Mosaic of the Horses” and its building in Carthage]. CRAI (in French). 135 (3): 471–507. doi:10.3406/crai.1991.15000.
- Charles-Picard, Gilbert (1964). "Un palais du IVe siècle à Carthage" [A 4th-century palace in Carthage]. CRAI (in French). 108 (1): 101–118. doi:10.3406/crai.1964.11682.
- Darder Lisson, Marta (1996). De nominibus equorum circensium. Pars occidentis [On the names of circus horses. Western part.] (in Catalan). Barcelone: Barcelona Academy of Literature. ISBN 978-84-922028-0-5.
- Darmon, Jean-Pierre (2000). "Joueurs de dés et autres énigmes de la mosaïque aux chevaux de Carthage" [Dice games and other enigmas from the mosaic to the horses of Carthage]. Bulletin de la Société nationale des antiquaires de France (in French): 106–118. ISSN 1153-2548.
- Darmon, Jean-Pierre (1995). "Mosaïques africaines" [African mosaics]. Carthage : l'histoire, sa trace et son écho [Carthage: history, its trace and its echo] (in Catalan). Paris: Association française d'action artistique. pp. 244–255. ISBN 978-2-879-00196-8.
- Ennabli, Abdelmajid; Fradier, Georges; Pérez, Jacques (1995). Carthage retrouvée [Carthage rediscovered] (in French). Tunis/Paris: Cérès/Herscher. ISBN 978-2-7335-0255-6.
- Ennaïfer, Mongi (1994). "La mosaïque aux chevaux d'El-Maharune (près de Thuburbo Minus, l'actuel Thébourba)" [The mosaic with the horses of El-Maharuna (near Thuburbo Minus, present-day Thebourba)]. Mélanges de l'École française de Rome: Antiquité (in French). 106 (1): 303–318. doi:10.3406/mefr.1994.1849. ISSN 0223-5102.
- Ennaïfer, Mongi (1983). "Le thème des chevaux vainqueurs à travers la série des mosaïques africaines" [The theme of victorious horses through the series of African mosaics]. Mélanges de l'École française de Rome: Antiquité (in French). 95 (2): 817–858. doi:10.3406/mefr.1983.1393. ISSN 0223-5102.
- Lancha, Janine (1999). "Les ludi circenses dans les mosaïques de l'Occident romain, Afrique exceptée" [The ludi circenses in the mosaics of the Western Roman Empire, excluding Africa] (PDF). Anales de Arqueología Cordobesa (in French) (10): 277–294. ISSN 1130-9741.
- Picard, Colette (1951). Carthage (in French). Paris: Les Belles Lettres.
- Rebuffat, René (1969). "Maisons à péristyle d'Afrique du Nord : répertoire de plans publiés" [North African peristyle houses: directory of published plans]. Mélanges de l'École française de Rome: Antiquité (in French). 81 (2): 659–724. doi:10.3406/mefr.1969.7587. ISSN 0223-4874.
- Salomonson, Jan Willem (1965). La mosaïque aux chevaux de l'antiquarium de Carthage [The mosaic with horses from the Carthage Antiquarium] (in French). La Haye: Imprimerie nationale.
- Thuillier, Jean-Paul (1999). "Agitator ou sparsor ? À propos d'une célèbre statue de Carthage" [Agitator or sparsor? About a famous statue of Carthage]. CRAI (in French). 143 (4): 1081–1106. doi:10.3406/crai.1999.16066.
- Yacoub, Mohamed (1995). Splendeurs des mosaïques de Tunisie [Splendor of Tunisian mosaics] (in French). Tunis: Agence nationale du patrimoine. ISBN 9973-917-23-5.
