= Opus regulatum =

Mosaic technique

Opus regulatum is the Latin name for the normal technique of Greek and Roman mosaic, made from tesserae that are larger than about 4 mm. Tesserae are laid in a pattern like grid or graph paper. The grout lines are aligned both vertically and horizontally unlike opus tessellatum, which consists of either horizontally or vertically aligned tesserae. It is useful in creating geometric patterns or for a background.

== See also ==
- Opus sectile
- Opus tessellatum
- Opus vermiculatum
