= Opus tessellatum =

Traditional mosaic technique

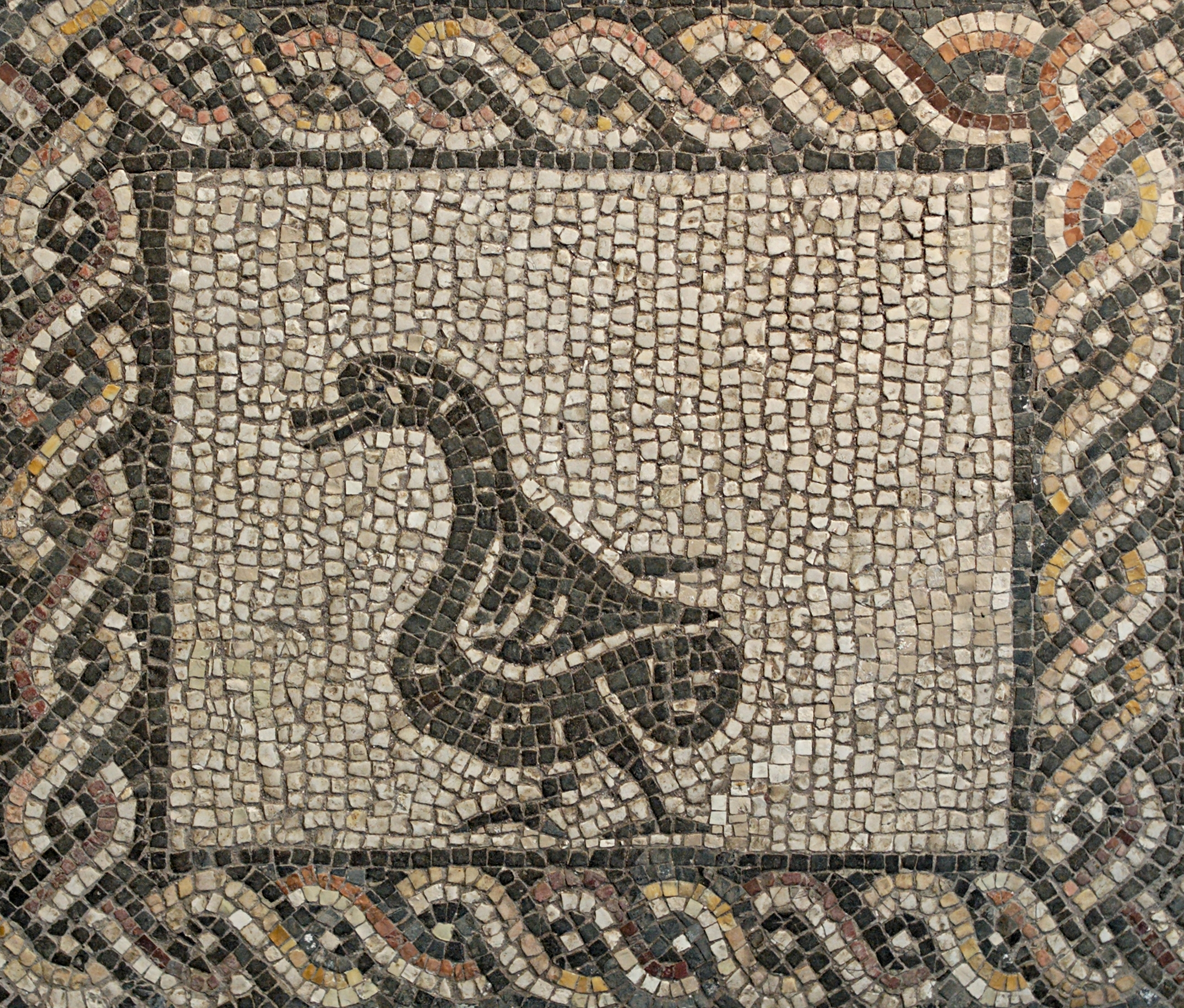
Opus tessellatum mosaic (3rd century AD)

Opus tessellatum is the Latin name for the normal technique of Greek and Roman mosaic, made from tesserae that are larger than about 4 mm. It is distinguished from the finer opus vermiculatum which used tiny tesserae, typically cubes of 4 millimetres or less, and was produced in workshops in relatively small panels which were transported to the site glued to some temporary support.

Opus tessellatum was used for larger areas and laid down at the final site. The two techniques were often combined, with small panels of opus vermiculatum called emblemata at the centre of a larger design in opus tessellatum. The tiny tesserae of opus vermiculatum allowed very fine detail, and an approach to the illusionism of painting. There was a distinct native Italian style of opus tessellatum using only black on a white background, which was no doubt cheaper than fully coloured work.

Opus tessellatum is usually used for backgrounds consisting of horizontally or vertically arranged lines, but not both in a grid, which would be opus regulatum.

Opus tessellatum was the most common mosaic technique among the ancient Greeks and Romans, in early Christianity and in the Byzantine Empire. It was a further development of the pebble mosaic technique, which utilized untreated pebbles. Later, tesserae were also used for pebble mosaics to give the motif richer colors. Finally, no later than the end of the 2nd century BC, mosaics in the eastern Mediterranean began to be created only from tesserae. Initially, tesserae were made exclusively of marble, but by the 2nd century AD they began to be made of intensely colored glass as well. With the rise of the Roman Empire, the technique of opus tessellatum was partially replaced by the more complex and expensive technique of opus vermiculatum in the first century BC, especially in Italy. From the 1st century AD, opus tessellatum mosaics with figural motifs began to be used again to create full floor mosaics. During the early Christian period, opus tessellatum became the predominant mosaic technique.

== Production ==
Mosaics are created in several stages:

1. First, a layer of aggregate made of large stones is laid to drain the soil. That's the statute.
2. This is followed by a 10-12 centimeter layer to level the ground. This layer, consisting of lime, gravel and stone chips, is called rudus.
3. A coarse mortar consisting of lime and terracotta elements is laid on top of it. This 2-3 cm thick layer is called a nucleus.
4. Finally, a bed - a thin layer of mortar - is formed before the pattern is created. The pattern is formed according to a preparatory drawing, which may or may not be transferred from the model.

== See also ==
- Mosaic
- Mosaics of Delos
- Roman masonry
