= Opus vermiculatum =

Ancient art method

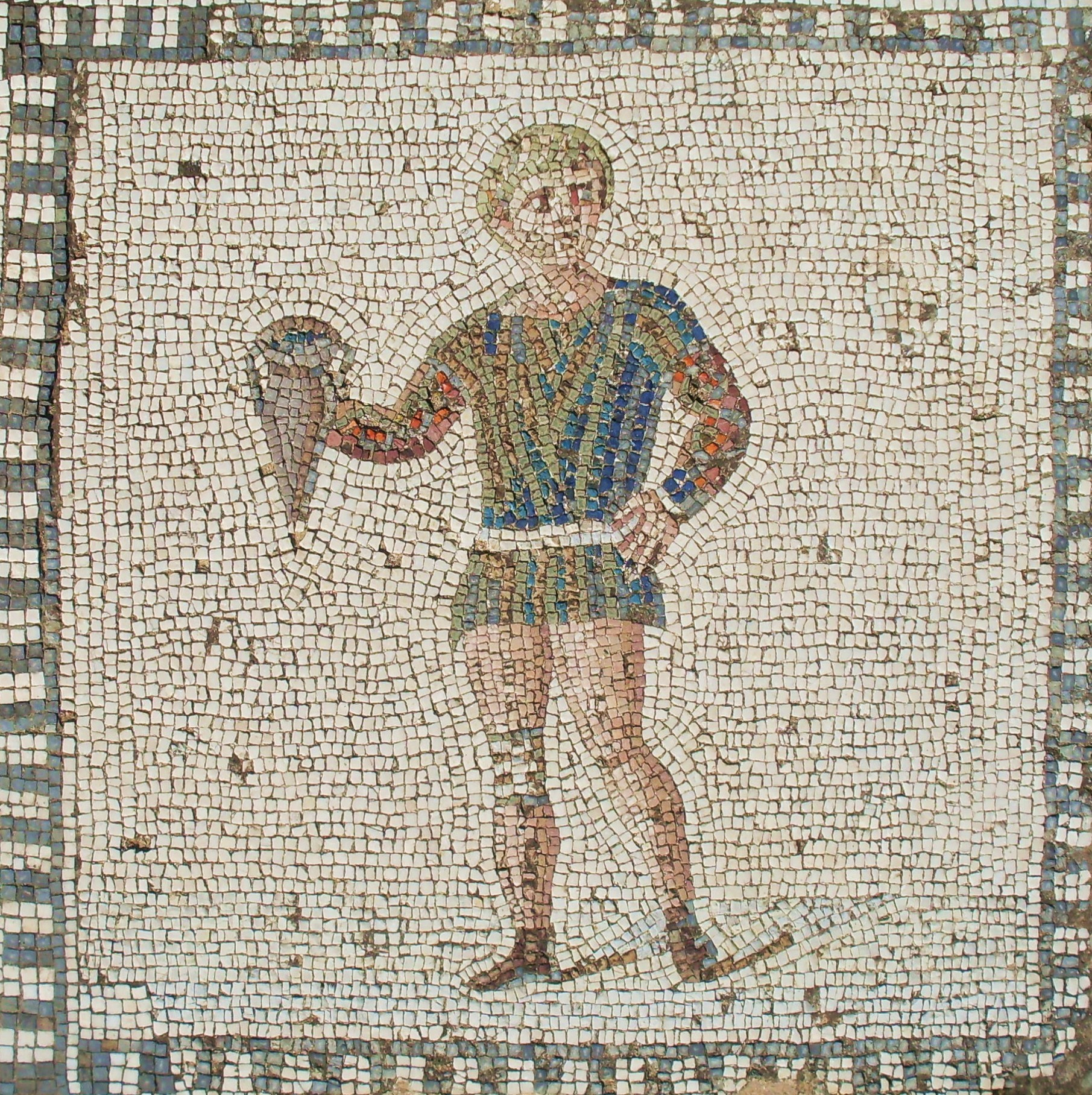
Mosaic of the Horses of Carthage

Opus vermiculatum is a method of laying mosaic tesserae to emphasise an outline around a subject. This can be of one or more rows and may also provide background contrast, e.g. as a shadow, sometimes with opus tessellatum. The outline created is often light and offset by a dark background for greater contrast. The name opus vermiculatum literally means "worm-like work", and has been described as one of the most demanding and elaborate forms of mosaic work. Usually opus vermiculatum is meant to put emphasis on the main design and foreground details of a work, using a smooth and flowing halo-effect. Sometimes it was used only around the head of a figure. The tesserae used were often square but can be variously shaped.

== History ==
Opus vermiculatum originated in Greece, later than other mosaic methods. The earliest known example is the Sophilos Mosaic of Thmuis, which has been dated to around 200 BC. The method spread throughout the Hellenistic world; for instance, the large corpus of surviving examples found on the island of Delos. In Egypt it was used for tomb decoration from the late-3rd to 1st centuries BC, and in Syria, it survived into later times. The Nile mosaic of Palestrina has a very refined use of color and shows an advanced development. This may indicate that the technique was based on paintings.

In the 1st century BC, it reached Italy along with other mosaic methods. Many fine examples of this style have been found at Pompeii. One remarkable work in particular portrays a crucial scene in the Battle of Issus, and was possibly copied from a 4th-century BC Greek painting or fresco. The use of opus vermiculatum declined after the 1st century AD, but continued to be employed for finer Roman mosaics until the 4th century. By then, mosaics were becoming increasingly impressionistic, taking advantage of the crystalline reflection of the tesserae, which was better suited to opus tessellatum. It was eventually entirely abandoned for this style.

Using this method allowed the emblems to be transferred, made in a workshop, and then brought in and installed as the centerpiece of a larger floor mosaic.

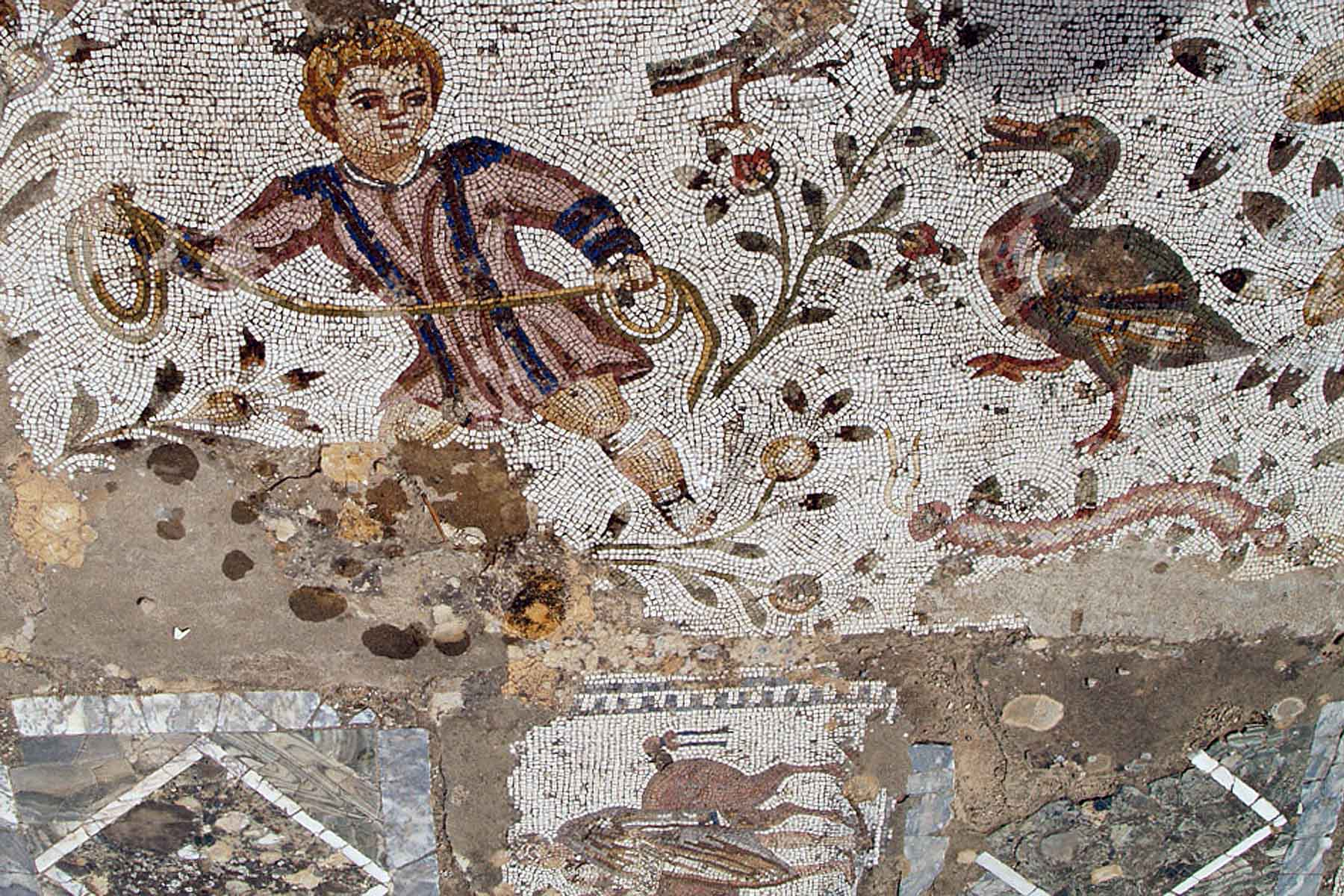

In time they gave way completely to framed central figural pieces, in which the tesserae are no smaller than the surrounding details in opus tessellatum. Using these shapes, the artist could very easily draw curves, silhouettes, and all forms of objects requiring greater precision. Mosaics were created in a continuous sequence, following the isohippus and the inner contour (the main internal boundary parts) of the desired figure, thus creating a painting-like effect.

As the demand for opus vermiculatum floors grew, floor mosaics executed in this technique were produced until the end of the first century, and Hellenistic emblems and unframed central figural parts, also executed in opus vermiculatum, continued to be in demand until the end of the third century.

Sketches of emblems were often paintings depicting scenes from everyday life or nature. To create them, artists used a specific color palette and a precision technique that paid special attention to detail to achieve effects of light, shadow, and perspective.

Artists who specialized in making emblems were two famous mosaicists of the 2nd century, Sosus of Pergamum, mentioned by Pliny in his Natural History and Dioscorides of Samos; whose originals or copies are found in Pompeii.

== See also ==
- Vermiculation
- Roman masonry
