= Opus musicum =

Opus musicum is a music magazine first published in 1969 in Brno, Czech Republic, by a publisher of the same name. The music magazine is published every two months and contains studies and essays on music and related cultural themes, articles, reviews, news.
