= Comptes rendus des séances de l'Académie des Inscriptions et Belles-Lettres =

- Discipline: History
- Language: French

Publication details
- History: 1857–present
- Publisher: Académie des Inscriptions et Belles-Lettres
- Frequency: Quarterly

Standard abbreviations
- ISO 4: C. R. Séances Acad. Inscr. B.-Lett.

Indexing
- ISSN: 1969-6663

Links
- Online archive

The Comptes rendus des séances de l'Académie des Inscriptions et Belles-Lettres (French pronunciation: [kɔ̃t ʁɑ̃dy de seɑ̃s də lakademi dez‿ɛ̃skʁipsjɔ̃ e bɛl lɛtʁ]) is an academic journal of history, philology, and archeology published by the Académie des Inscriptions et Belles-Lettres. It publishes articles in these fields as well as information on the life of the Academy and its various sessions.

== History ==
The origin of the journal goes back to an initiative by Ernest Desjardins, a member of the Academy, who decided in 1857 to publish the sessions of the Académie des Inscriptions et Belles-Lettres of the year. In a decision of 26 May 1865, the Academy took charge of the publication and entrusted his permanent secretary with its care. The publication was first weekly and since 1970, quarterly.

Issues are partly available (from 1900 to 2005) free of charge on the Persée portal.
