= Carthaginian tombstones =

Punic inscriptions in Tunisia

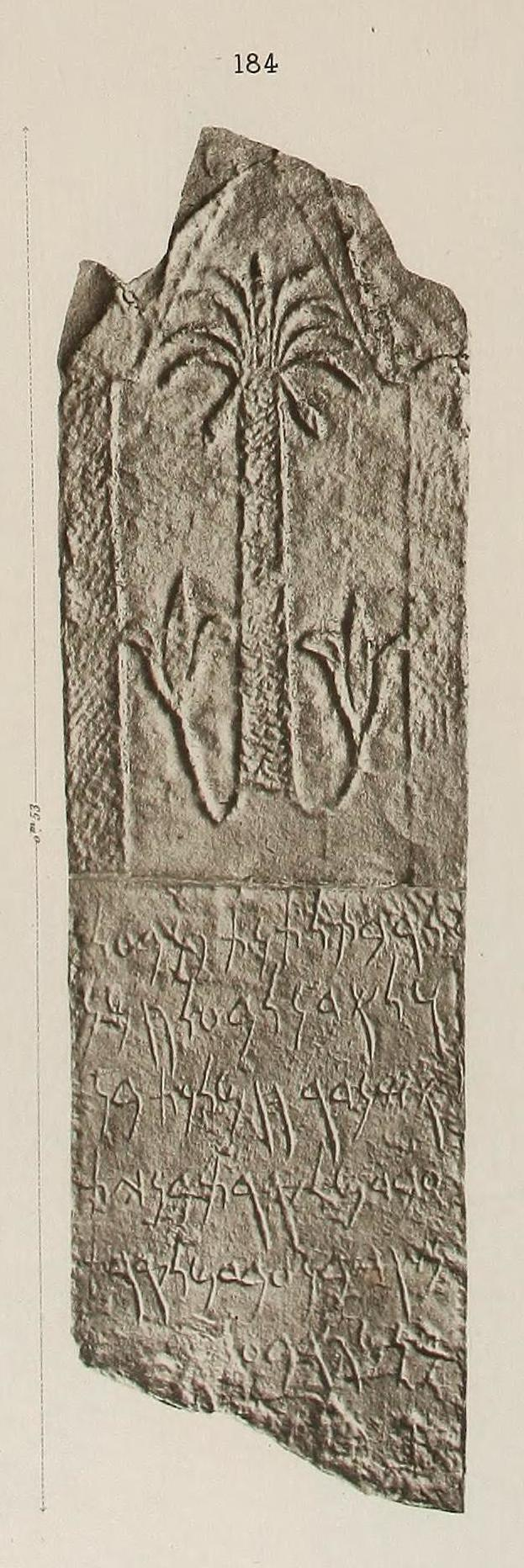
A typical Carthaginian tombstone. KAI 85 (Delattre 30, CIS I 184, KI 74), discovered in 1831, described as "the type of dedicatory inscriptions which is represented by many thousands of copies and, due to the formulaic nature of the text, only provides material for name research."

Carthaginian tombstones are Punic language-inscribed tombstones excavated from the city of Carthage over the last 200 years.

The first such discoveries were published by Jean Emile Humbert in 1817, Hendrik Arent Hamaker in 1828, Christian Tuxen Falbe in 1833 and Thomas Reade in 1837. Between 1817 and 1856, 17 inscriptions were published in total; in 1861 Nathan Davis discovered 73 tablets, marking the first large scale discovery.

The steles were first published together in the Corpus Inscriptionum Semiticarum; the first focused collection was published by Jean Ferron in 1976. Ferron identified four types of funerary steles:

- Type I: Statues (type I Α, Β or C depending on whether it is a "quasi ronde-bosse", a "half-relief" or a "Herma-type" )
- Type II: Bas-reliefs (Type II 1, where the figure stands out in an arc of a circle, and II 2, where it protrudes in a flattened relief)
- Type III: niche monuments or naiskos (type III 1, with a rectangular or trapezoidal niche, and III 2, niche with triangular top)
- Type IV: Engraved steles (extremely rare).

The oldest funerary stelae belong to Type III and date back to the 5th century BCE, becoming widespread at the end of the 4th century BCE. Bas-reliefs and statues appeared later.

== Gallery ==
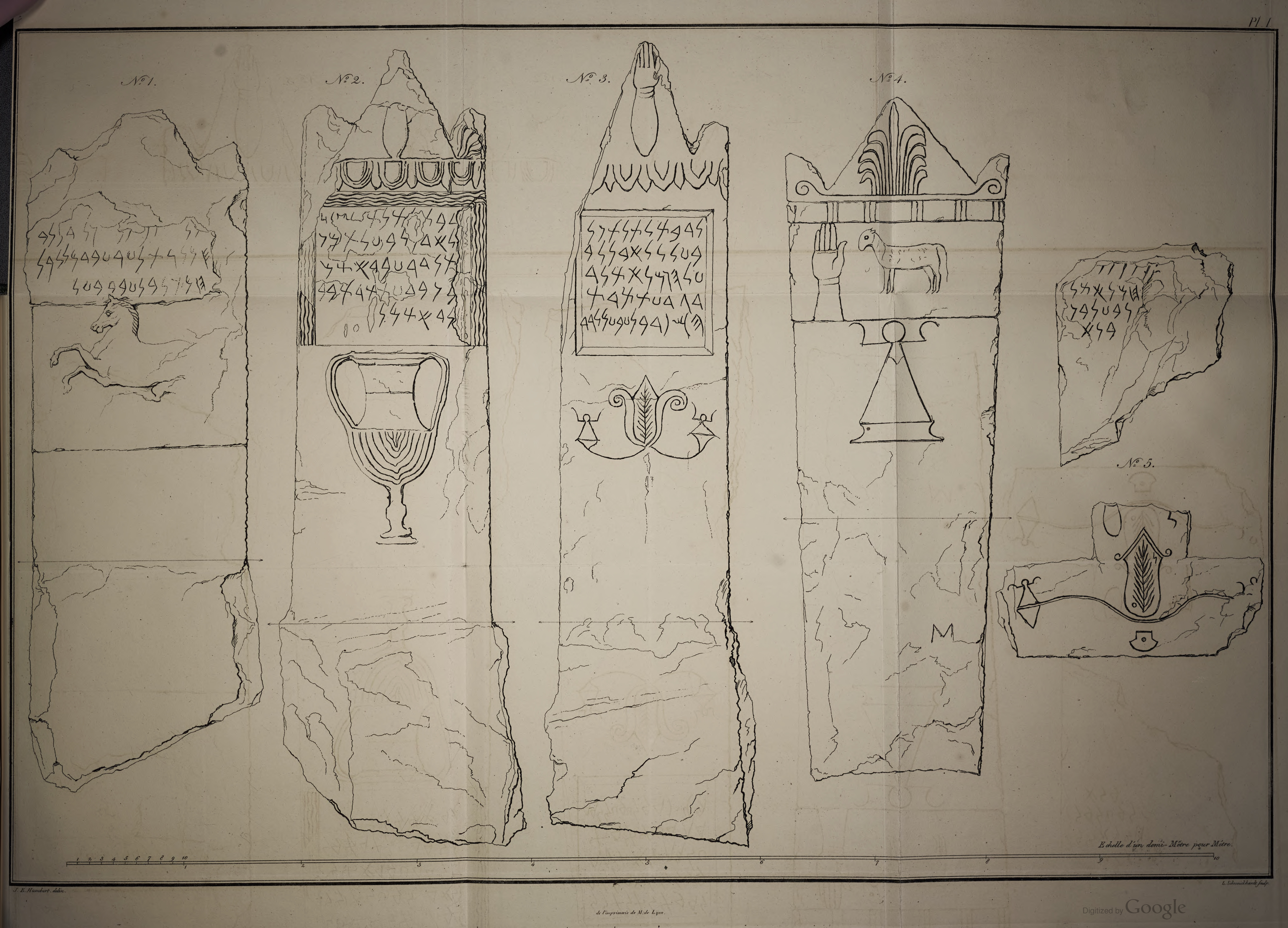
The Humbert Carthage inscriptions; the first published sketch of artefacts from Carthage. This was published in Jean Emile Humbert's Notice sur quatre cippes sépulcraux et deux fragments, découverts en 1817, sur le sol de l'ancienne Carthage. Today these are held in the Rijksmuseum van Oudheden

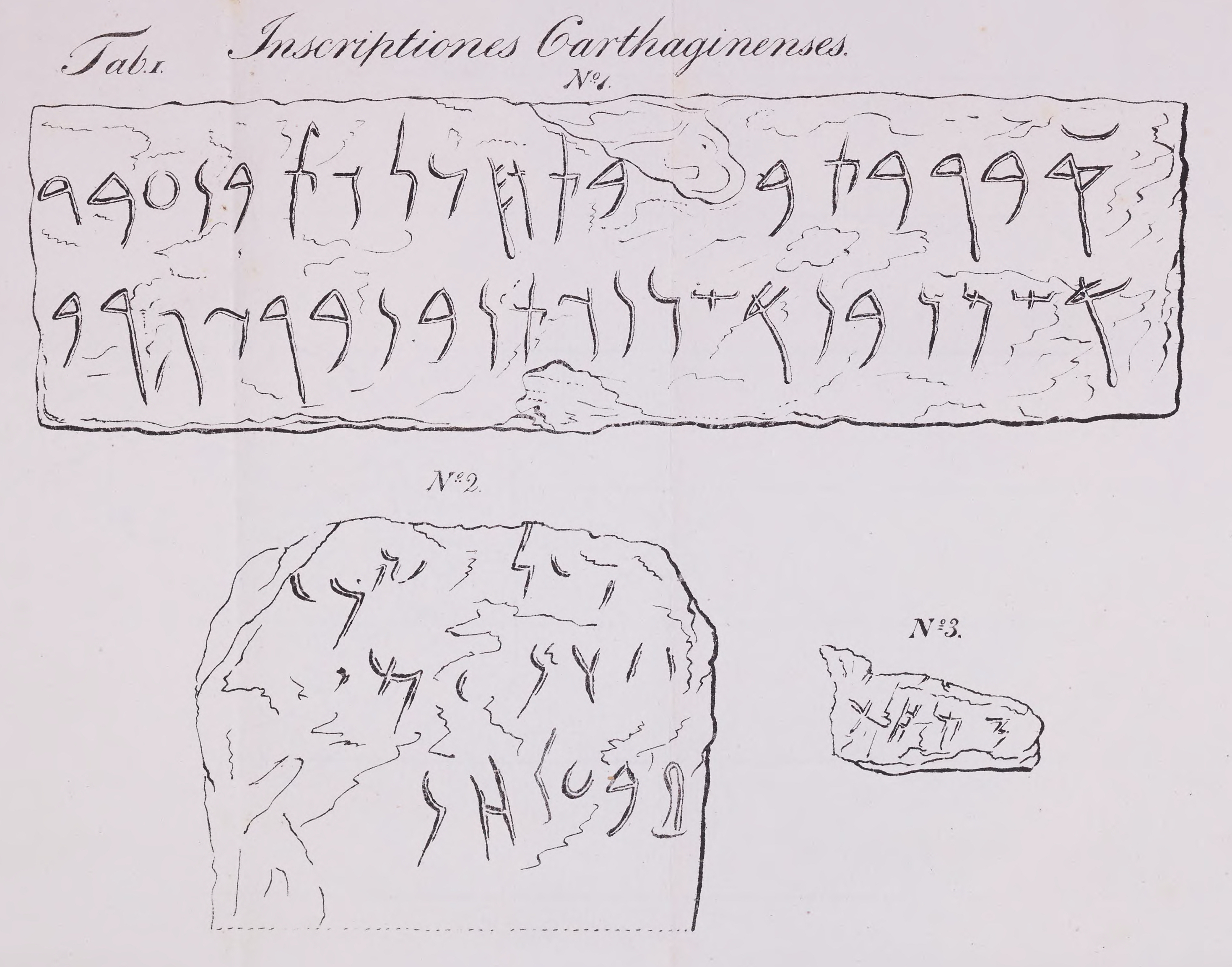
Further Carthaginian inscriptions found by Humbert and published by Hendrik Arent Hamaker in 1828, in his Miscellanea Phoenicia. The large inscription is held in the Rijksmuseum van Oudheden (CAb1)

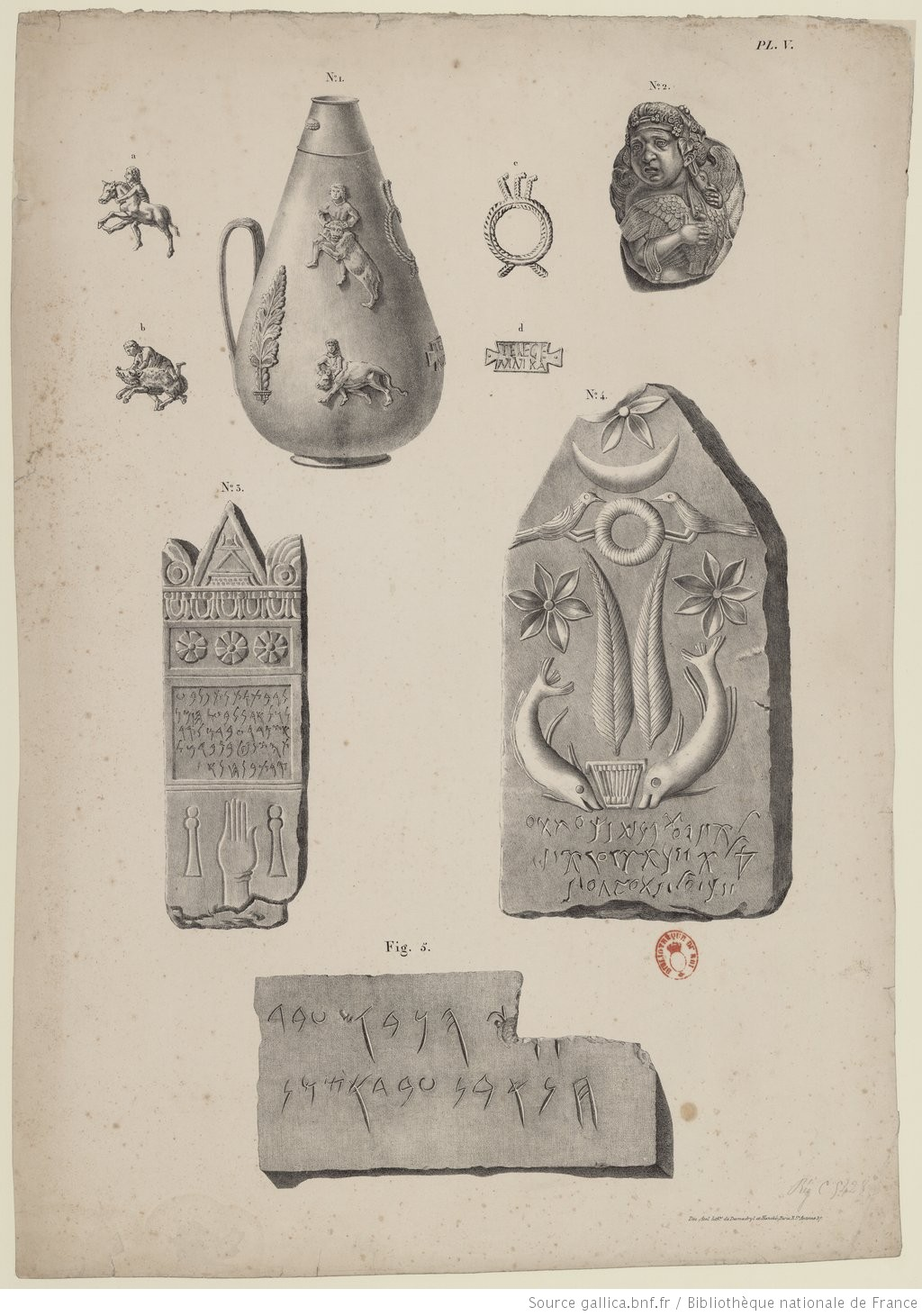
The Falbe Punic inscriptions; 1833 finds published in Christian Tuxen Falbe's Recherches sur l'emplacement de Carthage

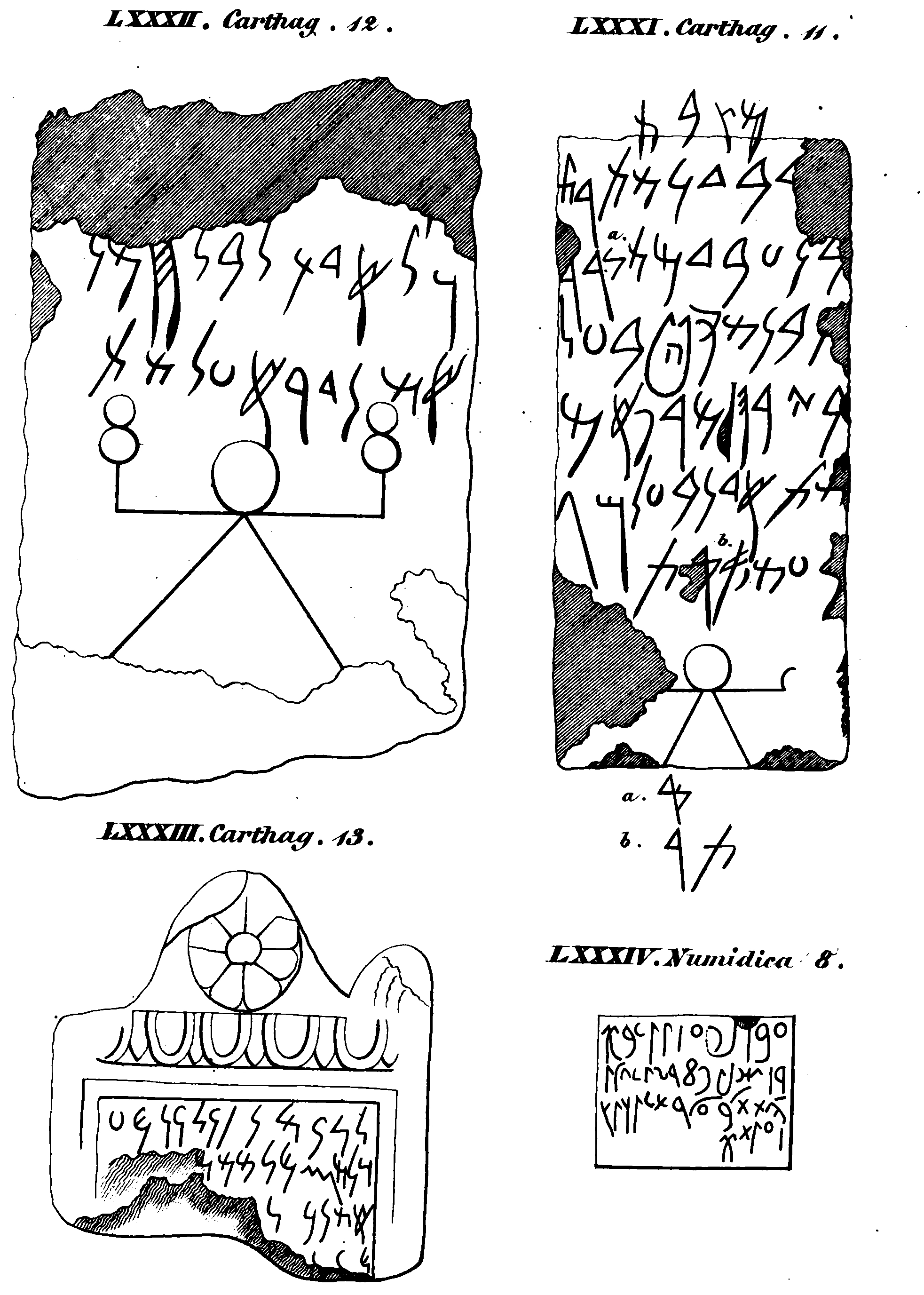
The Reade Punic inscriptions

== Bibliography ==
=== Primary sources ===
- Jean Emile Humbert, Notice sur quatre cippes sépulcraux et deux fragments, découverts en 1817, sur le sol de l'ancienne Carthage.
- Hendrik Arent Hamaker (1828), Miscellanea Phoenicia
- Christian Tuxen Falbe, Recherches sur l'emplacement de Carthage
- Augustus Wollaston Franks (1860). On Recent Excavations at Carthage, and the Antiquities discovered there by the Rev. Nathan Davis. Archaeologia, 38(1), 202–236. doi:10.1017/S0261340900001387
  - Davis, Nathan (1861). Carthage and Her Remains : Being an Account of the Excavations and Researches on the Site of the Phoenician Metropolis in Africa, and Other Adjacent Places. Bentley.
- Charles Ernest Beulé (1861), Fouilles à Carthage aux frais et sous la direction de M. Beulé
- von Maltzan, Heinrich (1870). "Anhang: Ueber die neuentdeckten phönicischen Inschriften von Karthago". Reise in den Regentschaften Tunis und Tripolis. Reise in den Regentschaften Tunis und Tripolis (in German). Dyk.
- Euting, Julius (1871). Punische Steine. Mémoires de l'Académie Impériale des Sciences de St.-Pétersbourg (in German). Académie impériale des sciences de St.-Pétersbourg.
- Euting, J. (1883). Sammlung der carthagischen inschriften. Sammlung der carthagischen inschriften (in German). K. J. Trübner.
- "TABULA TITULORUM VOTIVORUM; TANITIDI ET BAALI HAMMONI DICATORUM (180-3251.)". Corpus inscriptionum semiticarum (in Latin). Académie des Inscriptions et Belles-Lettres. 1890.
- Delattre, Alfred Louis (1890). Les tombeaux puniques de Carthage. Imprimerie Mougin-Rusand.
- Alfred Louis Delattre (1902). Une épitaphe punique de Carthage. In: Comptes rendus des séances de l'Académie des Inscriptions et Belles-Lettres, 46^{e} année, N. 5, 1902. pp. 522–523. DOI : https://doi.org/10.3406/crai.1902.17295
- Alfred Louis Delattre, Philippe Berger (1904) Épitaphes puniques et sarcophage de marbre. In: Comptes rendus des séances de l'Académie des Inscriptions et Belles-Lettres, 48^{e} année, N. 5, pp. 505–512. DOI : https://doi.org/10.3406/crai.1904.19929

=== Secondary sources ===
- Mendleson, Carole, Images & symbols: On Punic stelae from the tophet at Carthage, Archaeology & history in Lebanon. 2001, Num 13, pp 45–50
- Bénichou-Safar Hélène (1982), Chapitre III. LES INSCRIPTIONS FUNÉRAIRES, Les tombes puniques de Carthage. Topographie, structures, inscriptions et rites funéraires. Paris : Éditions du Centre National de la Recherche Scientifique, 452 p. (Études d'antiquités africaines)
- Ferron, Jean (1976). Mort-dieu de Carthage: ou, Les stèles funéraires de Carthage. P. Geuthner.
- Cintas, Pierre (1970). Manuel d'archéologie punique: Histoire et archéologie comparées. A. et J. Picard. ISBN 9782708400030.
- Stéphane Gsell, 1920–30, Histoire ancienne de l'Afrique du Nord, Tome 4, Chapitre IV, Les Pratiques Funéraires
- Lopez and Amadasi, The Epigraphy of the Tophet, 2013, In book: The Tophet in the Phoenician Mediterranean (= Studi Epigrafici e Linguistici sul Vicino Oriente antico 29–30, 2012–13) (pp.pp. 159–192)Chapter: The Epigraphy of the TophetPublisher: Essedue Edizioni, VeronaEditors: Paolo Xella
