= Scripturae Linguaeque Phoeniciae =

1837 study of the Phoenician language

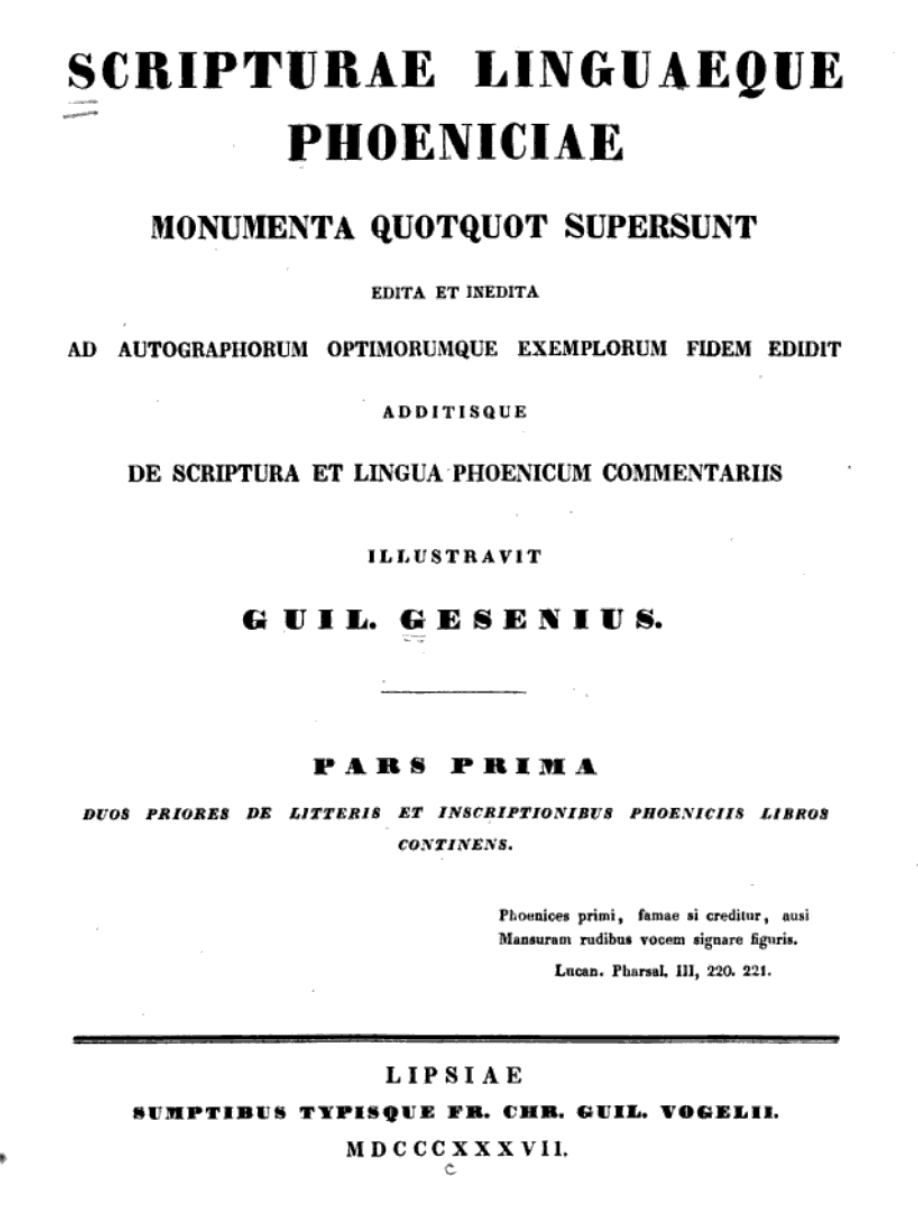
- Cover of part one (Pars Prima)
- Author: Wilhelm Gesenius
- Language: Latin
- Genre: Phoenician language
- Publication date: 1837
- Publication place: Leipzig

Scripturae Linguaeque Phoeniciae (in English: "The writing and language of Phoenicia"), also known as Phoeniciae Monumenta (in English: "Phoenician remains"), by German scholar Wilhelm Gesenius, was the first comprehensive review of Canaanite and Aramaic inscriptions, and an important early study of the Phoenician language.

Precededed by his prelimary treatise Paläographische Studien, his full publication was originally intended to be published under the name Marmora Phœnicia et Punica, quotquot supersunt, edidit, et prœtnissâ commentatione de litteris et linguâ Phœnicum et Pœnorum explicuit G. Gesenius (In English: "The Phoenician and Punic surviving inscriptions, published and explained with an excellent commentary on the letters and language of the Phoenicians and the Punics by W. Gesenius").

It was written in three volumes, combined in later editions. It was described by Reinhard Lehmann as "a historical milestone of Phoenician epigraphy".

It published all c.80 inscriptions and c.60 coins known in the entire Phoenicio-Punic corpus at the time, including the four then-known Aramaic inscriptions.

Many of the Latin names that Gesenius gave to the inscriptions have remained foundational to the study of Phoenician-Punic. Gesenius listed the inscriptions by geographic findspot and in chronological order of their discovery.

== History ==
In preparing for his publication, Gesenius traveled to Leiden, London, and Paris to inspect original inscriptions and coins, correcting prior scholarly errors based on casts or copies.

Gesenius' preliminary treatise, Paläographische Studien (1835), began by translating and annotating a 1772 Spanish treatise by Francisco Perez Bayer, enhancing it with his own corrections.

== Contents ==
=== Paläographische Studien (1835) ===
Paläographische Studien established two categories of Punic writing — Scriptura Urbana, found near Carthage and resembling classical Phoenician script known from Malta, Sardinia, Cyprus and Athens, and Scriptura Rustica (or Numidica), a looser, provincial script from inland Numidia. Gesenius reconstructed a “Numidian alphabet” to aid future decipherments.

=== Scripturae Linguaeque Phoeniciae (1837) ===
- Full Title: The writing and language of all the surviving Phoenician remains, published and unpublished copies of the best examples, illustrated and explained by Wilhelm Gesenius.
- First part: Containing the first two books on Phoenician letters and inscriptions [p. i–xxviii, 1–260], therein:
  - First book: containing Phoenician palaeography [p. 1–89]
  - Second book: illustrating the Phoenician inscriptions [p. 90–260]
- Second part: Containing two later books on the gods and the language of the Phoenicians [p. 261–482], therein:
  - Third book: On the Phoenician gods [p. 261–328]
  - Fourth book: Illustrating the Phoenician language [p. 329–482]
- Third part: containing forty-six inscribed stone tablets [Tab. 1–48 (sic)]

== inscriptions ==
=== Concordance ===
	Gesenius (1837)	Hamaker (1828)	CIS (1880s)	KAI (1960s)	Other
Malta
Cippi of Melqart	1		I 122	47	
Benhisa inscription	2		I 124	-	
Mdina steles	3-4	III 1-2	I 123	61	
Athenian Greek-Phoenician inscriptions	5-7		I 116, 117, 120	53, 55	
Pococke Kition inscriptions	8-40	IV	I 11, 46, 57-85	33, 35	
Nora Stone	41		I 144	46	
Sardinia and Sicily inscriptions	42-45				
Carthaginian
Humbert Carthage inscriptions	46-49, 51-53	I 1-3	I 173, 186-187, 240, 439-440		
Falbe Punic inscriptions	50, 54		I 199		
Reade Punic inscriptions	81-83		I 179, 441-442		
Punic-Libyan bilinguals	56	II 3		100	
Numidia
Temple Punic inscription (BM 125044)	57				NP 7
Falbe Punic inscriptions	58				NP 8
Hamaker?	59-60	II 1-2			NP 9-10
BM 125056	61				NP 11
Humbert Neo-Punic inscriptions (?)	62-63				NP 12-13
Reade Punic inscriptions	84				NP 14
Tripolitania Punic inscriptions	64-65	III 4-5			IPT 9-10
Gems and stamps	67-70		II 79, 81		
Non-Phoenician:
Carpentras Stela	71		II 141	269	TAD C20.5
Stela Saltiana	72		II 143		TAD D22.54
Turin Aramaic Papyrus	73	III 3	II 144		TAD A5.3
Blacas papyri	74-75		II 145		TAD C1.2
Pseudo-Phoenician or forgeries:
Other	76-80		II 54		

=== Full list ===
	Latin entry	English translation	Inscription
Chapter I. Maltese inscriptions
I	Inscriptio Melitensis prima bilinguis	First bilingual Maltese	Cippi of Melqart
II	Melitensis secunda	Second Maltese	Benhisa inscription
III	Melitensis tertia	Third Maltese	Mdina steles
IV	Melitensis quarta	Fourth Maltese	Mdina steles
Chapter II. Athenian inscriptions
V	Atheniensis prima	First Athenian	Athenian Greek-Phoenician inscriptions
VI	Atheniensis secunda	Second Athenian	Athenian Greek-Phoenician inscriptions
VII	Atheniensis tertia	Third Athenian	Athenian Greek-Phoenician inscriptions
Chapter III. Inscriptions of Citium
VIII	Citiensis prima	First of Citium	Pococke Kition inscriptions
IX	Citiensis secunda s. Oxoniensis	Second of Citium, or Oxford	Pococke Kition inscriptions
X	Citiensis tertia	Third of Citium	Pococke Kition inscriptions
XI	Citiensis quarta	Fourth of Citium	Pococke Kition inscriptions
XII	Citiensis quinta	Fifth of Citium	Pococke Kition inscriptions
XIII–XIV	Citiensis sexta, septima	Sixth and seventh of Citium	Pococke Kition inscriptions
XV	Citiensis octava	Eighth of Citium	Pococke Kition inscriptions
XVI–XVII	Citiensis nona, decima	Ninth and tenth of Citium	Pococke Kition inscriptions
XVIII	Citiensis undecima	Eleventh of Citium	Pococke Kition inscriptions
XIX–XX	Citiensis duodecima, tertia decima	Twelfth and thirteenth of Citium	Pococke Kition inscriptions
XXI–XXII	Citiensis quarta decima, quinta decima	Fourteenth and fifteenth of Citium	Pococke Kition inscriptions
XXIII	Citiensis sexta decima	Sixteenth of Citium	Pococke Kition inscriptions
XXIV–XXV	Citiensis septima et octava decima	Seventeenth and eighteenth of Citium	Pococke Kition inscriptions
XXVI–XXVII	Citiensis undevicesima, vicesima	Nineteenth and twentieth of Citium	Pococke Kition inscriptions
XXVIII–XXIX	Cit. 21, 22	Citium 21 and 22	Pococke Kition inscriptions
XXX	Cit. 23	Citium 23	Pococke Kition inscriptions
XXXI	Cit. 24	Citium 24	Pococke Kition inscriptions
XXXII–XXXIV	Cit. 25, 26, 27	Citium 25, 26, and 27	Pococke Kition inscriptions
XXXV–XXXVII	Cit. 28–30	Citium 28–30	Pococke Kition inscriptions
XXXVIII–XL	Cit. 31–33	Citium 31–33	Pococke Kition inscriptions
XLI bis	Gemma Citiensis	Gem of Citium	
Chapter IV. Inscriptions found in Sardinia and Sicily
XLI	Inscriptio Sardica	Sardinian	Nora Stone
XLII	Inscriptio Erycina	Erycian	
XLIII	Vas Panormitanum	Vessel from Panormus	
XLIV	Inscriptio Marsalensis	Marsala	
XLV	Gemma Sardica	Sardinian gem	
Chapter V. Carthaginian inscriptions
XLVI–XLIX	Carthaginensis prima, secunda, tertia, quarta	First, second, third, and fourth Carthaginian	Humbert Carthage inscriptions
L	Carthaginensis quinta	Fifth Carthaginian	Falbe Punic inscriptions
LI	Carthaginensis sexta	Sixth Carthaginian	Humbert Carthage inscriptions
LII–LIII	Carthaginensis septima, octava	Seventh and eighth Carthaginian	Humbert Carthage inscriptions
LIV	Carthaginensis nona	Ninth Carthaginian	Falbe Punic inscriptions
LV	Carthaginensis decima	Tenth Carthaginian	
Chapter VI. Punic-Numidian inscriptions
LVII	Numidica prima	First Numidian	
LVIII	Numidica secunda	Second Numidian	Falbe Punic inscriptions
LIX	Numidica tertia	Third Numidian	
LX	Numidica quarta	Fourth Numidian	
LXI	Numidica quinta	Fifth Numidian	
LXII–LXIII	Numidica sexta et septima	Sixth and seventh Numidian	
LXIV	Tripolitana prima bilinguis	First bilingual Tripolitanian	Tripolitania Punic inscriptions
LXV	Tripolitana altera	Other Tripolitanian	Tripolitania Punic inscriptions
LXVI	Inscriptio Gerbitana	Gerba	
Chapter VII. Gems and seals found in various and uncertain regions
LXVII	Gemma Berolinensis inedita	Unpublished Berlin gem	Canaanite and Aramaic seal inscriptions
LXVII bis	Sigillum ineditum ex collectione Saltii	Unpublished seal from the Salt collection	Canaanite and Aramaic seal inscriptions
LXVII ter	Gemma Demidoffii	Demidoff gem	Canaanite and Aramaic seal inscriptions
LXVIII	Gemma Hagana	Hague gem	Canaanite and Aramaic seal inscriptions
LXIX	Scarabaeus Lancii	Lanci scarab	Canaanite and Aramaic seal inscriptions
LXX	Gemma Aegyptiaca Phoenicia	Phoenician Egyptian gem	Canaanite and Aramaic seal inscriptions
Chapter VIII. Semitic monuments found in Egypt
LXXI	Monumentum Carpentoractense	Carpentras monument	Carpentras Stela
LXXII	Monumentum Rogersii	Rogers monument	
LXXIII	Papyrus Turinensis	Turin papyrus	Turin Aramaic Papyrus
LXXIV–LXXV	Papyri Blacassiani	Blacas papyri	Blacas papyri
Chapter IX. Pseudo-Phoenician and spurious items
LXXVI	Etrusca pro Phoeniciis habita	Etruscan items regarded as Phoenician	
LXXVII	Persica pro Phoeniciis habita	Persian items regarded as Phoenician	
LXXVIII–LXXIX	Cyrenaicae et Atlanticae inscriptiones spuriae	Spurious Cyrenaic and Atlantic	
LXXX	Attica Fourmonti	Fourmont’s Attic	
Second Appendix: Four Reade inscriptions recently brought from Africa
LXXXI	Carthaginiensis undecima	Eleventh Carthaginian	Reade Punic inscriptions
LXXXI	Carthaginiensis duodecima	Twelfth Carthaginian	Reade Punic inscriptions
LXXXI	Carthaginiensis tertia decima	Thirteenth Carthaginian	Reade Punic inscriptions
LXXXI	Numidica octava	Eighth Numidian	Reade Punic inscriptions
Third Appendix: Later notes on the bilingual inscription from Dougga
LVI	Tuggensem bilinguem	Dougga bilingual	Punic-Libyan bilinguals
Chapter I. Phoenician coins proper
I	Tyrus	Tyre	
II	Sidon	Sidon	
III	Acco s. Ptolemais	Acre	
IV	Laodicea	Latakia	
V	Marathus	Amrit	
VI	Aradus, Berytus, Carne	Arwad, Beirut, and Carne	
Chapter II. Coins of Cilicia
VII	Tarsus	Tarsus	
VIII	Incertae Ciliciae urbes	Uncertain Cilician cities	
Chapter III. Coins of Sicily and the adjacent islands
IX	Panormus	Palermo	
X	Heraclea	Heraclea Minoa	
XI	Syracusae	Syracuse	
XII	Motye	Motya	
XIII	Cossura	Pantelleria	
XIV	Gaulos	Gozo	
Chapter IV. Hispanic Punic coins
XV	Gades	Cádiz	
XVI	Sesti	Sexi	
XVII	Abdera	Abdera	
XVIII	Belus s. Belon	Baelo Claudia	
XIX	Malaca	Málaga	
Chapter V. African Punic coins
XX	Juba maior	Juba I	
XXI	Juba minor	Juba II	
XXII	Achulla	Acholla	
XXIII	Vacca s. Vaga	Vaga	
XXIV	Sabratha	Sabratha	
XXV	Siga	Siga	
XXVI	Africae aliarumque regionum nummi incerti	Coins of Africa and other regions of uncertain attribution	

== Editions ==
- Gesenius, F.H.W. (1837). Scripturae linguaeque phoeniciae monumenta quotquot supersunt edita et inedita ad autographorum optimorumque exemplorum fidem edidit additisque de scriptura et lingua Phoenicum commentariis illustravit Guil. Gesenius: Duos priores de litteris et inscriptionibus phoeniciis libros continens. 1 (in Latin). Vol. 1. sumptibus typisque Fr. Chr. Guil. Vogelii.
  - Scripturae linguaeque phoeniciae (in Latin). Vol. 2. 1837.
  - Scripturae linguaeque phoeniciae (in Latin). Vol. 3. 1837.

=== Notable preceding works ===
- Gesenius, Wilhelm; Bayer, Francisco Pérez; Hollmann, Hermann (1835). Paläographische Studien über phönizische und punische Schrift (in German). F. C. W. Vogel.

== Bibliography ==
- Foreign Quarterly Review (1838). Review of Wilhelm Gesenius's publications. L. Scott.
- Lehmann, Reinhard G. [in German] (2013). "Wilhelm Gesenius and the Rise of Phoenician Philology" (PDF). Beihefte zur Zeitschrift für die alttestamentliche Wissenschaft. 427. Berlin / Boston: De Gruyter. Archived from the original (PDF) on 2016-03-04.
- Hamaker, Hendrik Arent (1828). Miscellanea Phoenicia, sive Commentarii de rebus Phoenicum, quibus inscriptiones multae lapidum ac nummorum, nominaque propria hominum et locorum explicantur, item Punicae gentis lingua et religiones passim illustrantur. S. et J. Luchtmans.
- Yates, James (1837). "Remarks on". Journal of the Royal Asiatic Society of Great Britain and Ireland. 4 (1). Royal Asiatic Society of Great Britain and Ireland: 138–153. ISSN 0035-869X. JSTOR 25207487.
- CIS: Corpus Inscriptionum Semiticarum
- KAI: Kanaanäische und Aramäische Inschriften
