= Turin Aramaic Papyrus =

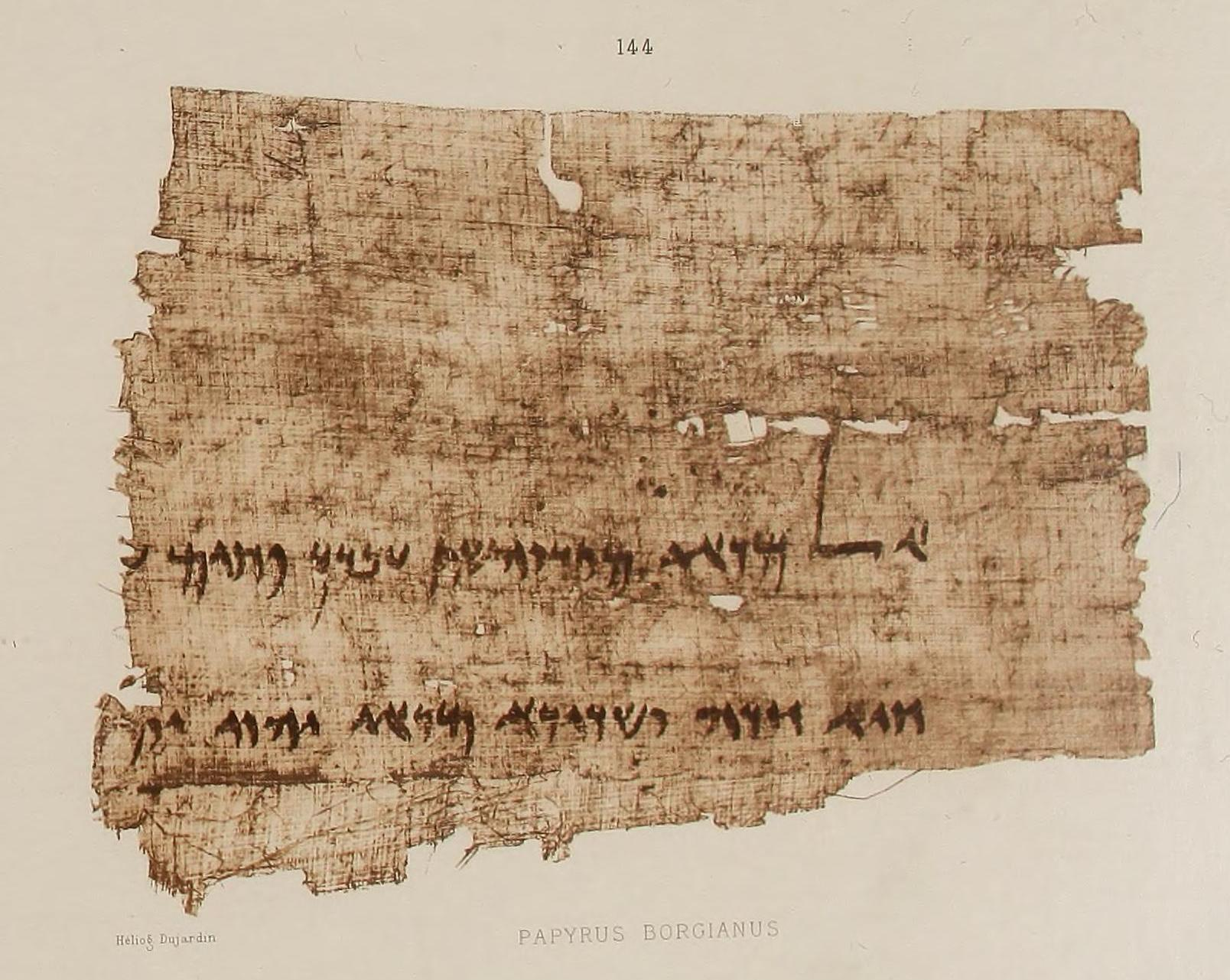
- The papyrus in the 1880s
- Discovered: 1823-1824
- Discovered by: Bernardino Drovetti
- Present location: Museo Egizio
- Identification: CIS II 144, TAD A5.3
- Language: Aramaic

The Turin Aramaic Papyrus, also known as Papyrus Taurinensis, is a fragment of an Aramaic papyrus found by Bernardino Drovetti in 1823–24. It is known as CIS II 144 and TAD A5.3. Although it contains just two lines, it is notable as the first published Aramaic inscription found in Egypt.

It is held in Turin's Museo Egizio, with providence number 645.

== Publication and scholarly debate ==
The first published reference was by Jean-François Champollion in June 1824, after visiting the Museo Egizio in Turin shortly after it first opened, at which point Drovetti's collection comprised the entire contents of the museum. Champollion's letter on the collection concluded: "But what should be of particular interest is that among the papyri of the collection, there is a Phoenician manuscript; unfortunately there are only fragments; but perhaps we will find others in the number of papyri still to be unrolled." A similarly hopeful but brief statement was made by Michelangelo Lanci in the following year.

In 1828, Hendrik Arent Hamaker became the first to publish a copy of the fragment and comment on it in detail. The copy was made by Desiré-Raoul Rochette. Hamaker described it as “that most celebrated fragment of Drovetti's, which, four years before, excited the anticipation of the learned, lovers of these letters”. In his review of all known Semitic inscriptions at that time, Hamaker wrote:

…in the forms of letters, this inscription has an affinity with the famous Carpentras Stele… However, not all the letters of both monuments have exactly the same system, and the writing of the fragment of the papyrus comes much closer to the common square. Among other things, Aleph, Gimel, Waw, Heth, Qoph and Shin are similar to Hebrew in such a way that they are immediately recognized by everyone, even those ignorant of palaeography; while of the rest, Dalet, Yodh, Kaph and Resh differ from the vulgar script only by a slight bend… Meanwhile, from the similarity of the letters in these two inscriptions, it is clear that we have not without reason rejected the opinion of Kopp in the previous diatribe, referring this writing to the Arameans rather than to the Phoenicians. For the most ancient Phoenicians, or Hyksos, when they had not yet passed into Palestine, but were still wandering in the deserts of Arabia, held Egypt under their dominion, and afterwards, after many intervening centuries, the same nation was transferred to Egypt in great numbers by Psammetichus and his successors, and adorned with many privileges. But the idea that the Syrians, or the Aramaeans, brought colonies to the same place and set up the seat of their affairs there, is neither probable, nor can I find it handed down by any writer. That being the case, manifestly clear, these specimens of Egyptian writing, closely connected with the Hebrew square, would undermine the latter’s tradition of its Assyrian origin. What remains to confirm this opinion cannot be answered except by the Carpentras stele, clearly dedicated to Osiris, but at any rate our inscription could have come from an Egyptian Jew, using Assyrian letters.

In 1833 another copy was made by Gustav Seyffarth and published in a monograph by Eduard Friedrich Ferdinand Beer, entitled (in English translation): Ancient Semitic inscriptions and papyri as many as were found in Egypt, published and unpublished, listed and related to the Hebrew-Judaic origin with Hebrew palaeography, in which he compared the fragment to the Carpentras Stele.

In 1837, in his Scripturae Linguaeque Phoeniciae, which was to become "a historical milestone of Phoenician epigraphy", Wilhelm Gesenius commented on the prior publications and concluded:

The dialect is pure Chaldean, as in all these Egyptian monuments; but the author of the fragment, unless everything deceives me, is a worshiper of Jove, i.e. a Jew, in these verses, which seem to have been taken from a liturgical book, invoking God's help in his calamity or that of his people (as you understand עבדך). Our fragment will do nothing to illuminate Phoenician affairs in Egypt, and nothing to increase true Phoenician literature: but it is nevertheless most useful for the history of Hebrew writing and for illuminating the origins of square writing, to which ours is very close.

== Gallery ==
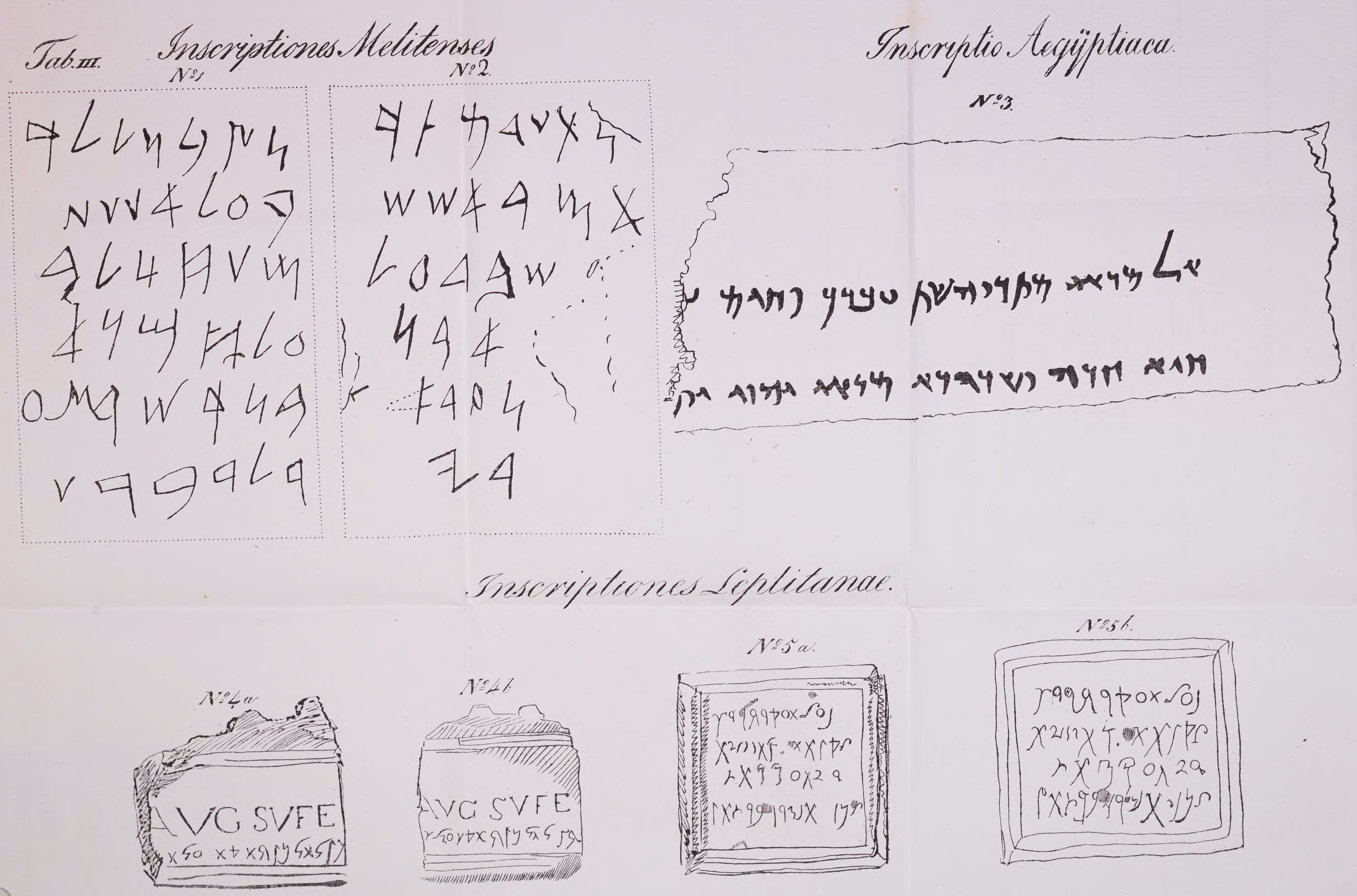
Hamakar / Rochette 1828

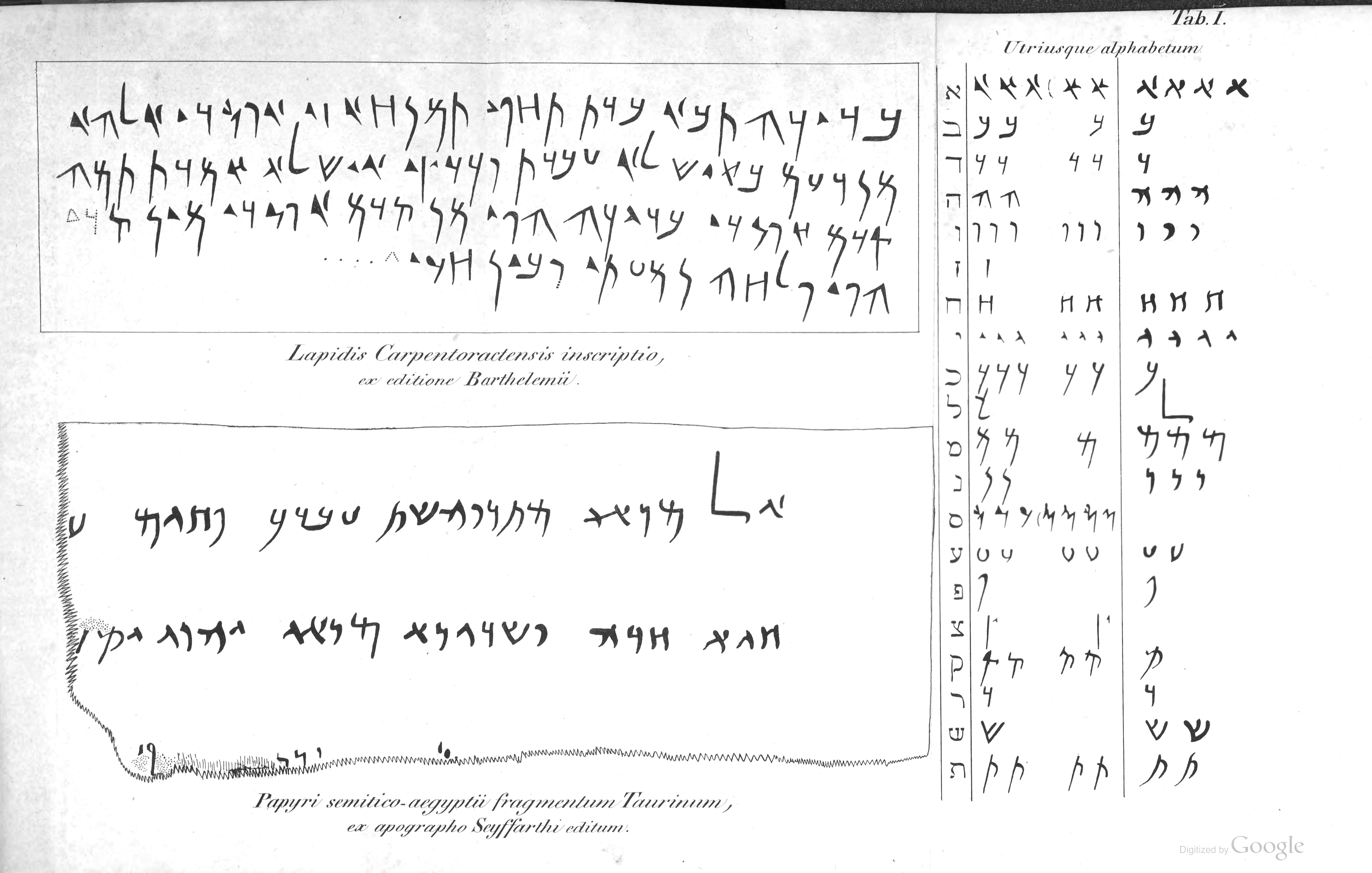
Beer / Seyffarth 1833

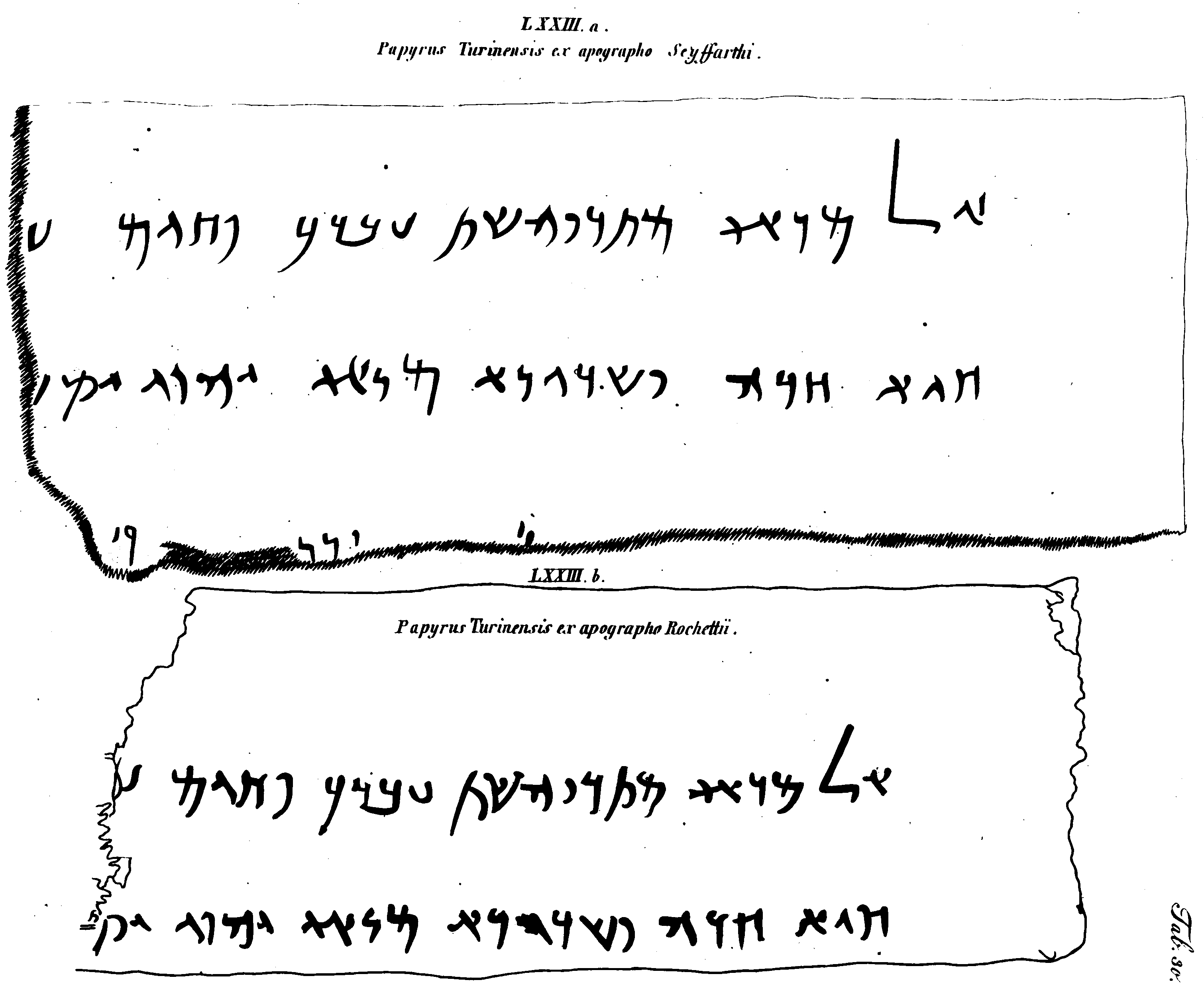
Gesenius 1837

== Bibliography ==
- Alexander, P.S., “Remarks on Aramaic Epistolography in the Persian Period”, Journal of Semitic Studies 23 (1978), 162.
- Dion, P.E., “La Lettre araméenne passe-partout et ses sous-espèces”, Revue Biblique 89 (1982), 529–32, 547–54
- Fitzmyer, J.A., "Aramaic Epistolography", in A Wandering Aramean: Collected Aramaic Essays (SBL Monograph Series, 25. Scholars Press, 1979), 189, 192.
- Naveh, J., "The Development of the Aramaic Script", Proceedings of the Israel Academy of Sciences and Humanities 5 (Jerusalem, 1970), 36.
- Porten, B., Archives from Elephantine (Berkeley, 1968), 48, 57, 159
- Porten, B.,”Aramaic Letters in Italian Museums”, in Studi in onore di Edda Bresciani (Pisa, 1985), 435-438
