= Reade Punic inscriptions =

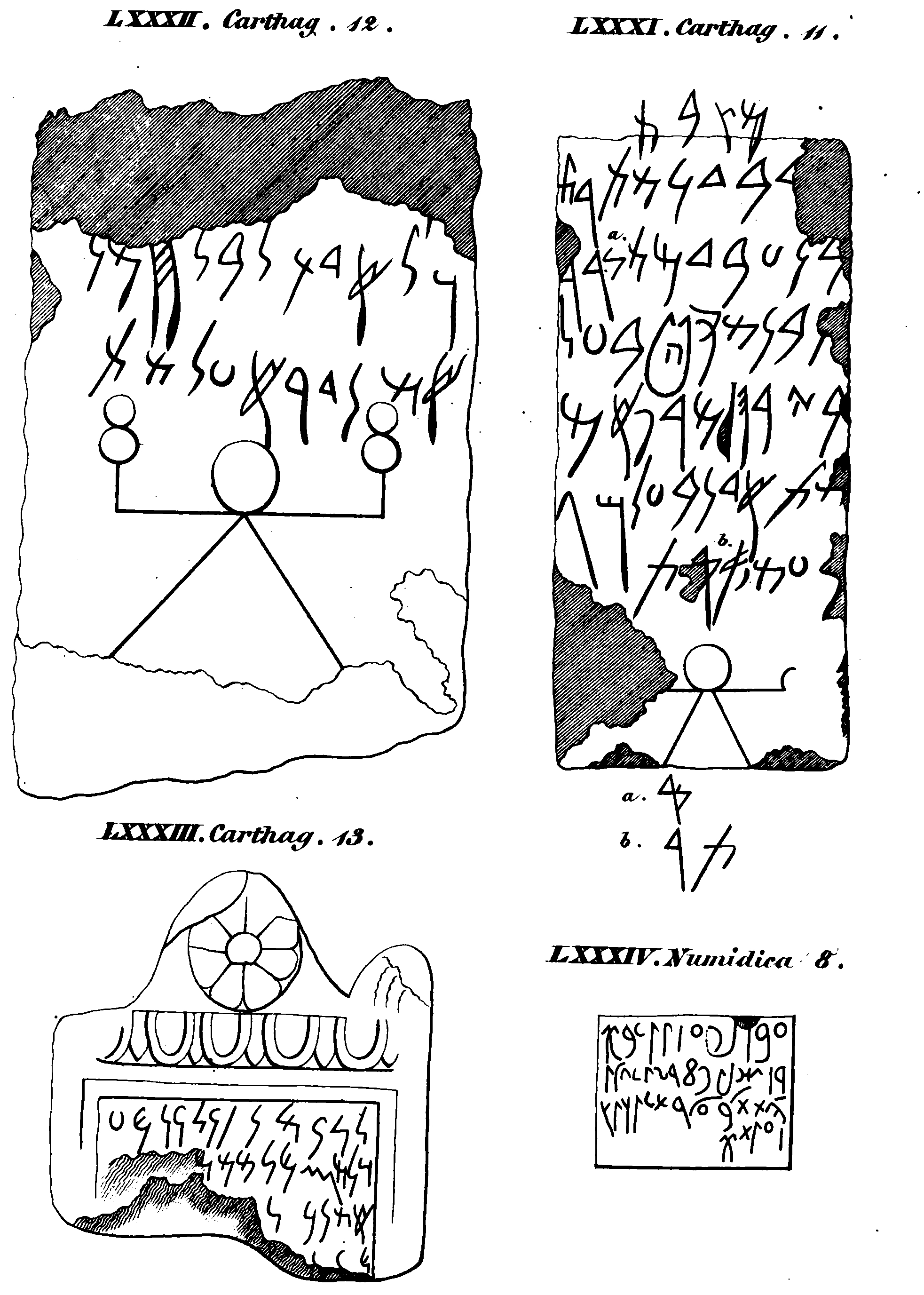
The Reade inscriptions: Carthage 11-13 and Numidia 8 in 1837 Scripturae Linguaeque Phoeniciae

The Reade Punic Inscriptions refer to four Phoenician-language funerary inscriptions discovered in 1836-1837 by Sir Thomas Reade, who had recently been appointed as the British consul general in Tunis.

The inscriptions — three from Carthage and one from Numidia — were documented and published in the appendix (Appendix Altera) of the second volume of Wilhelm Gesenius’s Scripturae Linguaeque Phoeniciae; Gesenius had received the inscriptions via Friedrich August Rosen shortly before he was due to publish the volume.

== Discovery ==
The inscriptions were discovered in or before 1835 during a wave of European interest in Punic antiquities. According to Gesenius, the inscriptions were copied and drawn by Filippo Basiola Honegger, a German associate of Reade.

Three inscriptions were found embedded in reused masonry within the ruins of Carthage. The fourth was discovered in “Numidia”, carved directly into a rock. The original stones were transported to England, while drawings remained with Reade.

== Inscriptions ==
The numbers below follow Wilhelm Gesenius’s Scripturae Linguaeque Phoeniciae – they were the last four inscriptions listed out of the 83 inscriptions analyzed in the publication.

=== LXXXI – Carthaginian XI (CIS I 179) ===
A funerary monument of eight lines, largely legible and engraved on a dressed stone slab. The inscription names the deceased, their father, and grandfather, followed by a eulogy. The script is consistent with late Punic funerary customs.

=== LXXXII – Carthaginian XII (CIS I 441) ===
Similar in type to LXXXI, this inscription is engraved on fine limestone but partially broken at the top-right corner. Despite this, much of the text remains readable, and some divine invocations are preserved.

=== LXXXIII – Carthaginian XIII (CIS I 442) ===
A fragmentary inscription, now limited to partial phrases and letter clusters. While the full meaning is lost, it remains of paleographic interest.

=== LXXXIV – Numidian VIII ===
The fourth inscription, discovered in “Numidia” in the area of Maghrawa (35.914°N 9.146°E), just north of Maktar. It was carved into living rock and significantly eroded. It likely served a votive or commemorative function and stands out for being in situ rather than reused.

== See also ==
- Punic-Libyan bilinguals

== Bibliography ==
- Gesenius, F. H. W. (1837). Scripturae linguaeque Phoeniciae monumenta quotquot supersunt edita et inedita ad autographorum optimorumque exemplorum fidem edidit additisque de scriptura et lingua Phoenicum commentariis illustravit Guil. Gesenius: Duos priores de litteris et inscriptionibus phoeniciis libros continens (in Latin). Vol. 2. sumptibus typisque Fr. Chr. Guil. Vogelii.
- M'Charek, Ahmed (1988). "Maghrāwa, lieu de provenance des stèles punico-numides dites de la Ghorfa". Mélanges de l'École française de Rome: Antiquité (in French). 100 (2): 731–760. doi:10.3406/mefr.1988.1606. ISSN 0223-5102.
