= Humbert Carthage inscriptions =

Punic inscriptions in Tunisia

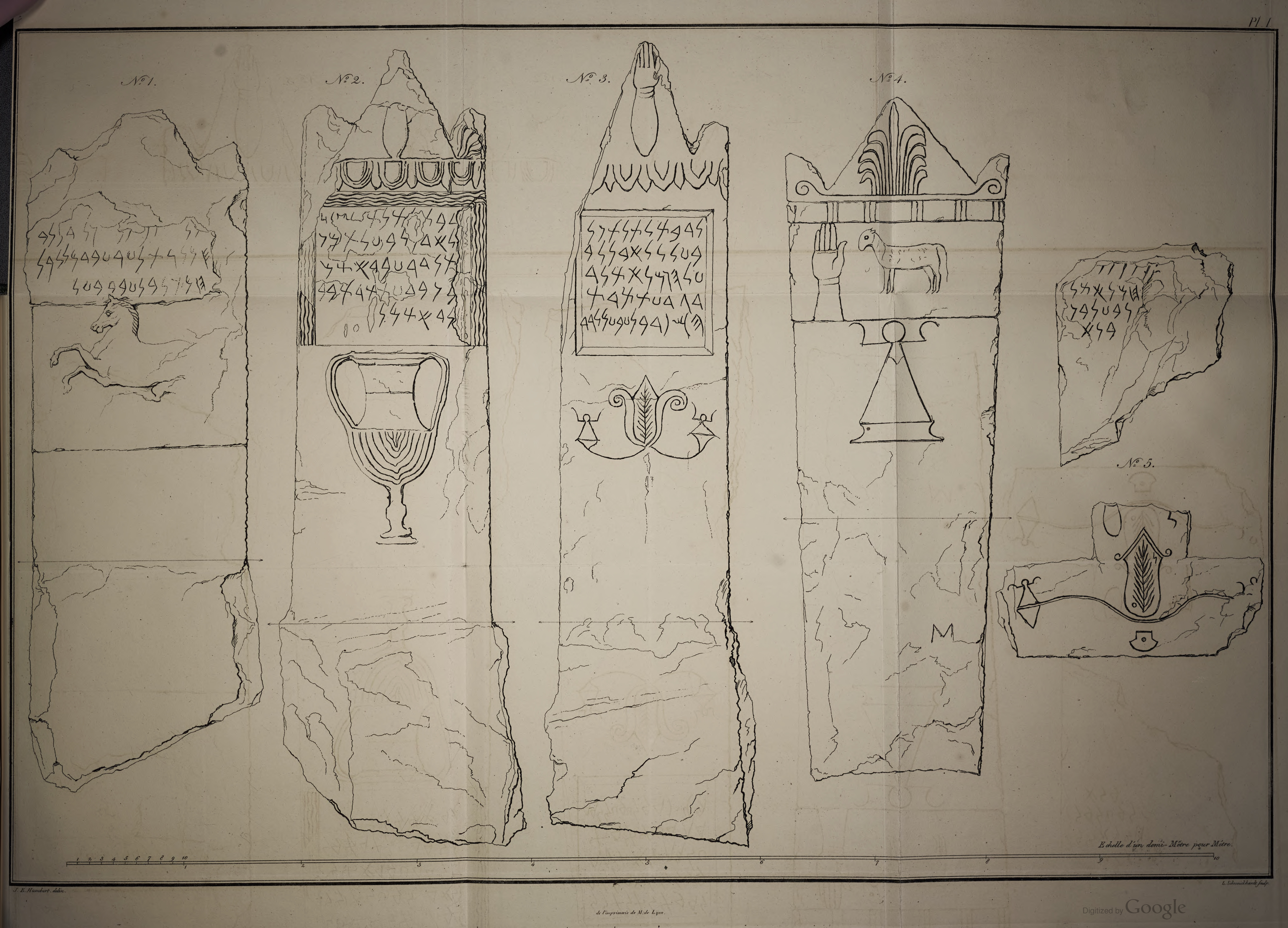
The first four inscriptions, as published by Humbert

The Humbert Carthage inscriptions are seven Punic inscriptions, found in Carthage by Jean Emile Humbert in 1817 in Husainid Tunisia. They were the first published Punic inscriptions found in Carthage.

Today they are held in the Rijksmuseum van Oudheden. On receipt of the stelae, Caspar Reuvens, the museums’s founding director, noted that “when the possession of these pieces in any museum becomes known to the scholarly world, the fame of that museum will be established”.

== Publication ==
In 1821 Humbert published the first five Carthaginian inscriptions widely known in his publication: Notice sur quatre cippes sépulcraux et deux fragments, découverts en 1817 sur le sol de l’ancienne Carthage. In 1822, Hamaker republished these inscriptions, including his own interpretations and a wealth of linguistic commentary, in: Diatribe philologico-critica aliquot monumentorum Punicorum, nuper in Africa repertorum, interpretationem exhibens..., and in the same year, Reuvens published his observations in: Periculum animadversionum archaeologicarum ad cippos Punicos Humbertianos, Musei antiquarii Lugduno-Batavi. In 1824, a new inscription, based on a drawing from Tunis, was published by F. Münter in: Om en nylig blandt Ruinerne af Carthago opdaget Punisk Gravskrift. In 1828, Hamaker released his major work Miscellanea Phoenicia sive commentarii de rebus Phoenicum... which commented on these inscriptions. This was superseded in 1837 with Gesenius' monumental work: Scripturae Linguaeque Phoeniciae.

=== Humbert publications ===
The first four were discovered in 1817 and published in 1821 in Humbert's Notice sur quatre cippes sépulcraux et deux fragments, découverts en 1817, sur le sol de l'ancienne Carthage, which included the first published sketches of artefacts from Carthage.

==== Gallery ====
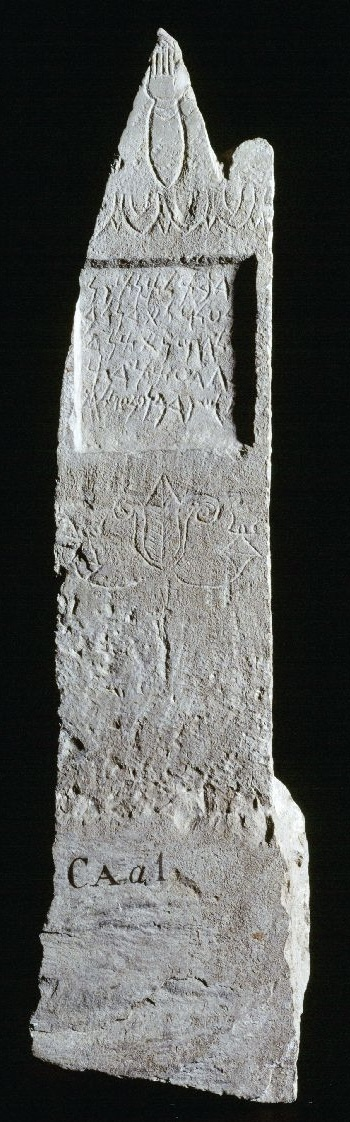
CAa 1 CIS I 240 (NE 431, 9)

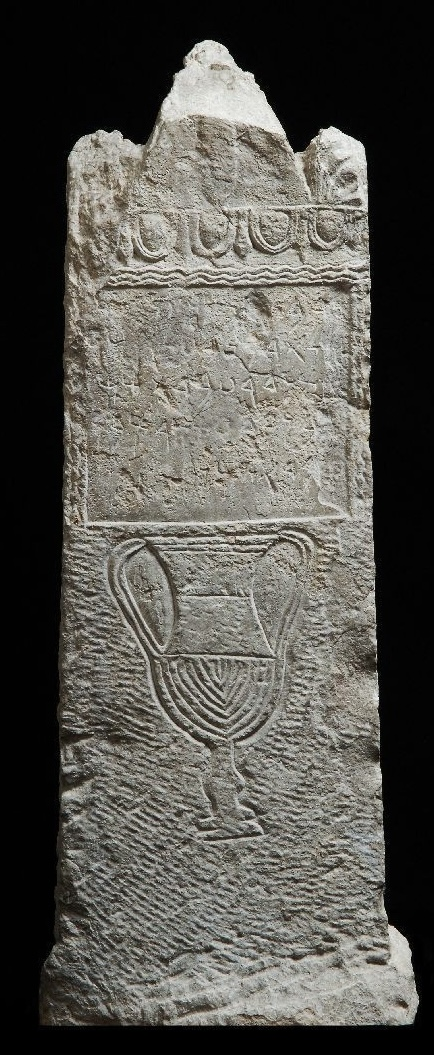
CAa 2 CIS I 187

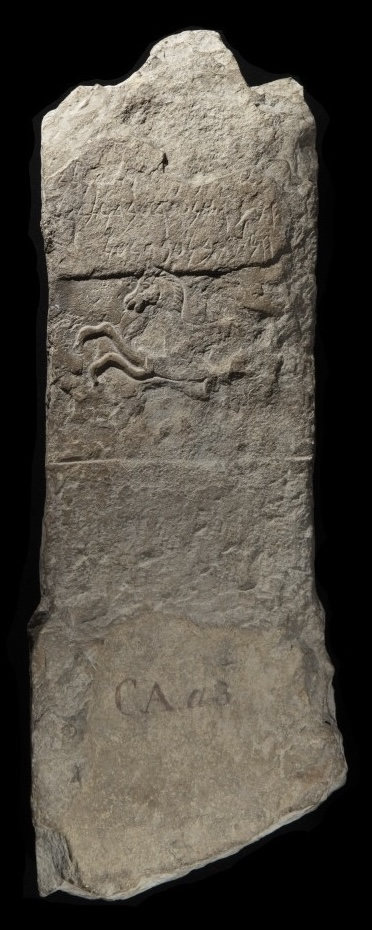
CAa 3 CIS I 186

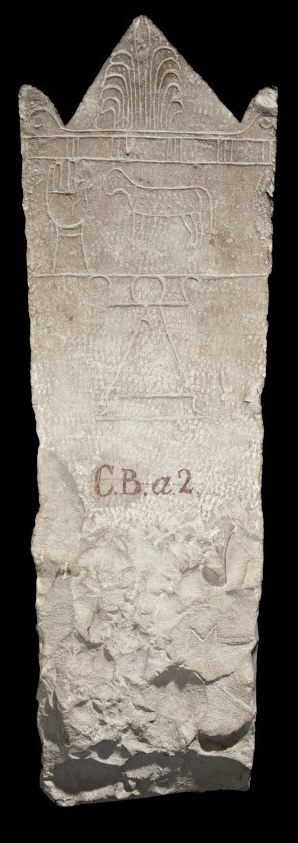
CAa 4

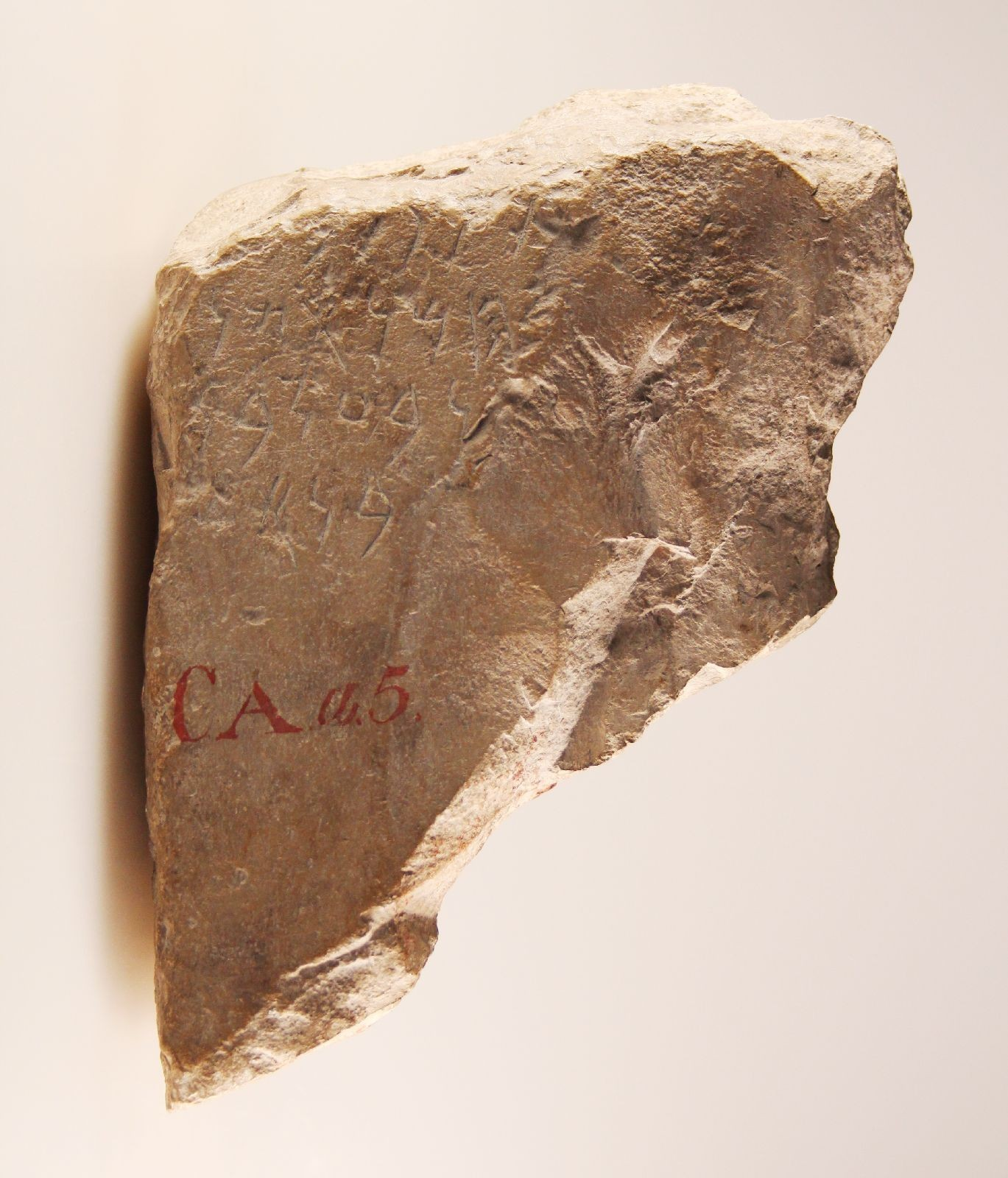
CAa 5 CIS I 439

=== Hamaker publications ===
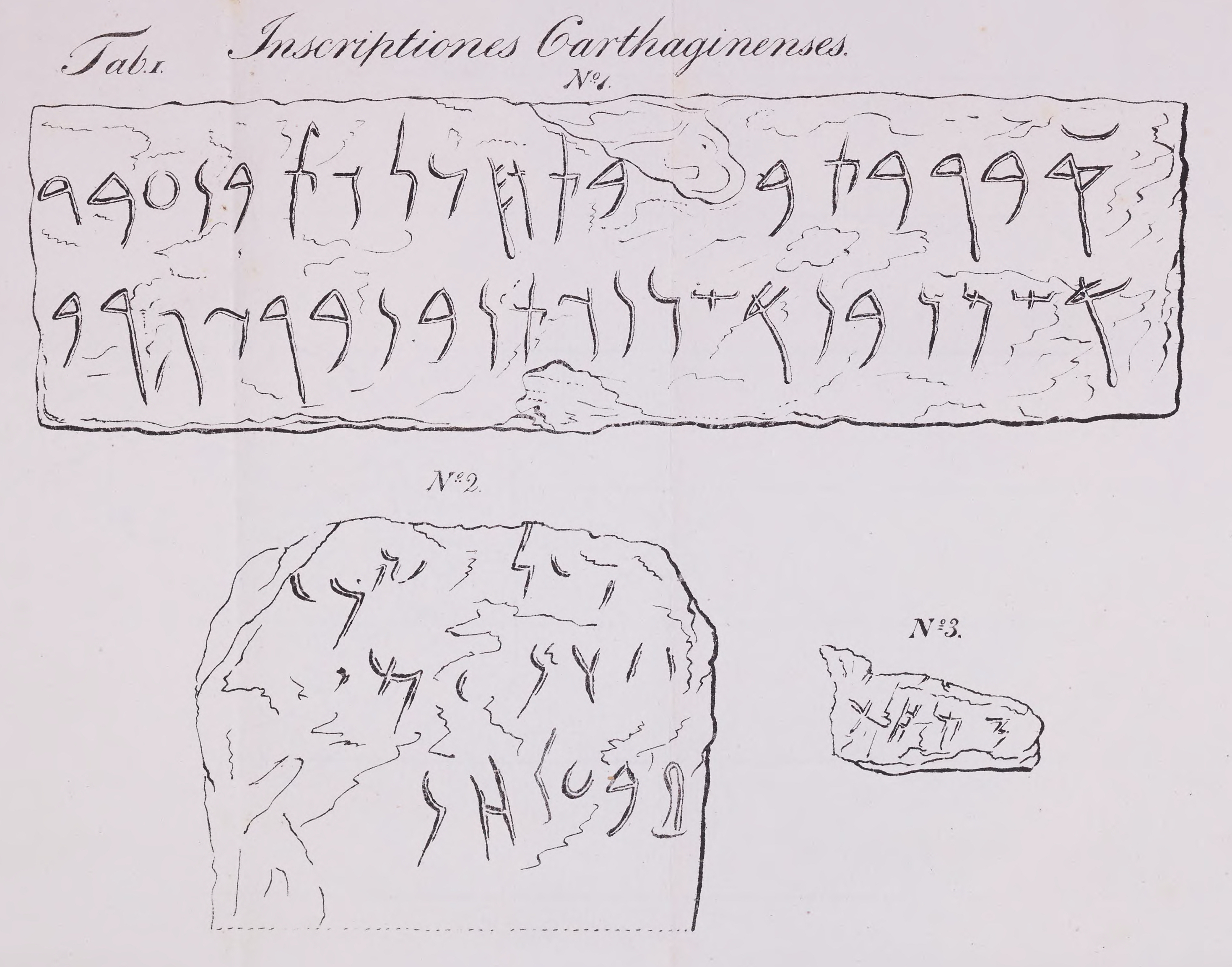
Hamaker's inscriptions in 1828

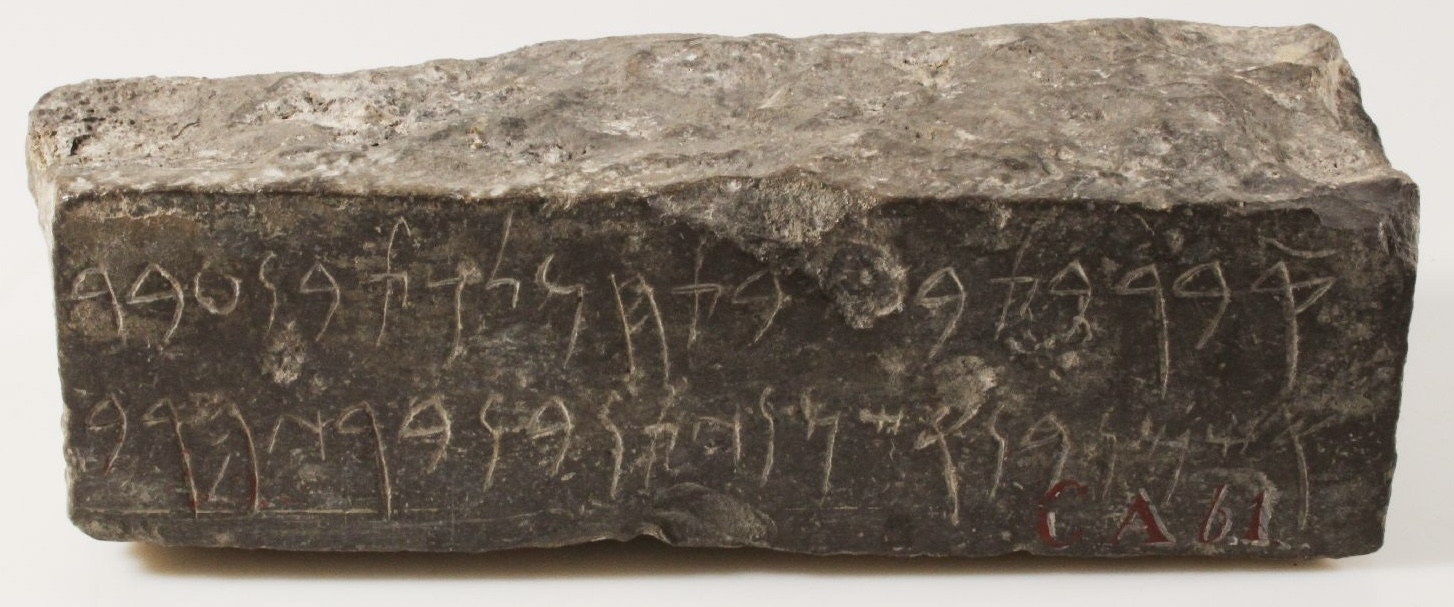
Stele number 1, from the Rijksmuseum van Oudheden

A further three Punic inscriptions, found in Carthage in 1824 and published in Hamaker's 1828 Miscellanea Phoenicia.

The largest and best inscribed was first published in 1824 by Friedrich Münter. It is labelled as CAb1 in the Rijksmuseum van Oudheden. It is known as NE 432, 16. It was not published in CIS.

The other two are known as CIS I 440 (CAa6, mid sized fragment) and CIS I 173 (smallest fragment); the latter is presumed to have been lost.

== Bibliography ==
- Halbertsma, Ruurd B. (2003). "6. JEAN EMILE HUMBERT. The quest for Carthage". Scholars, Travellers and Trade. London New York: Psychology Press. p. 71-88. ISBN 978-0-415-27630-6.
- "TABULA TITULORUM VOTIVORUM; TANITIDI ET BAALI HAMMONI DICATORUM (180-3251.)". Corpus inscriptionum semiticarum (in Latin). Académie des Inscriptions et Belles-Lettres. 1890.
- Humbert, Jean Emile (1821). Notices sur quatre cippes sépulcraux et deux fragments découverts en 1817, sur le sol de l'ancienne Carthage (in French). M. de Lyon.
- Hamaker, Hendrik Arent (1828). Miscellanea Phoenicia (in Latin). apud S. et J. Luchtmans.
- Dantoni, Diletta (2011), Le stele Puniche di Jean Emile Humbert, doi:10.13140/RG.2.2.19858.25288
- Leemans, Conradus (1842). "GEDENKSTEENEN MET PHOENICISCHE, CARTHAAGSCHE, NUMIDISCHE EN LIBY-PHOENICISCHE OPSCHRIFTEN". Beredeneerde beschrijving der Asiatische en Amerikaansche monumenten van het Museum van oudheden te Leyden (in Dutch). Hazenberg.
