= Carl Peter Wilhelm Gramberg =

German theologian and biblical scholar

Carl Peter Wilhelm Gramberg (24 September 1797 – 29 March 1830) was a German theologian and biblical scholar.

== Biography ==
Gramberg attended university at Halle, where he studied Hebrew Bible and Theology under Wilhelm Gesenius and Julius Wegscheider. His major work, in addition to commentaries on Chronicles and Genesis, was the Kritische Geschichte der Religionsideen des alten Testaments, of which he published two of a projected four volumes before his death in Oldenburg at the age of thirty-three.

== Writings ==
In the Kritische Geschichte, Gramberg divides the history of Old Testament religion into seven periods: (1) Genesis, Exodus, and Judges, reflecting the time of the monarchy from King David to Hezekiah; (2) Samuel and Ruth, originating in the early monarchy but written down just before the Babylonian Exile; (3) the prophetic books of Isaiah 1-35, Hosea, Joel, Amos, Micah, Nahum, and Zephaniah, from the 8th-7th centuries BCE; (4) the cultic regulations of Leviticus and Numbers, as well as Jeremiah, Lamentations, Ezekiel, Habakkuk, and Obadiah, from the time of the Babylonian Exile; (5) Kings, Deuteronomy, Joshua, Isaiah 40–66, Proverbs, Job, and Jonah, from the end of the Exile; (6) the period of the return from the Exile, represented by, among others, the books of Ezra and Nehemiah; and (7) the Persian and Hellenistic periods, in which were written Chronicles, Esther, and Daniel. Gramberg then evaluates the history of Old Testament religion, specifically the priesthood (vol. 1) and the theocratic rulers (vol. 2), in light of this schema. The priests are seen as having consolidated their power as time went on, with the theocracy surviving only in messianic hopes for a glorified Messiah king.

Much of Gramberg's historical division is owed to the work of W. M. L. de Wette, on whose Beiträge zur Einleitung in das Alte Testament Gramberg frequently draws. He did not share with de Wette, however, an adherence to the philosophy of Jakob Friedrich Fries. The lasting influence of Gramberg's work, which he was unable to complete in his short lifetime, is most visible in Johann Friedrich Ludwig George's book on Israelite festivals, which extended the historical reconstruction of de Wette and Gramberg to its natural conclusion.
