= Cisterns of La Malga =

- Cisterns of La Mâalga
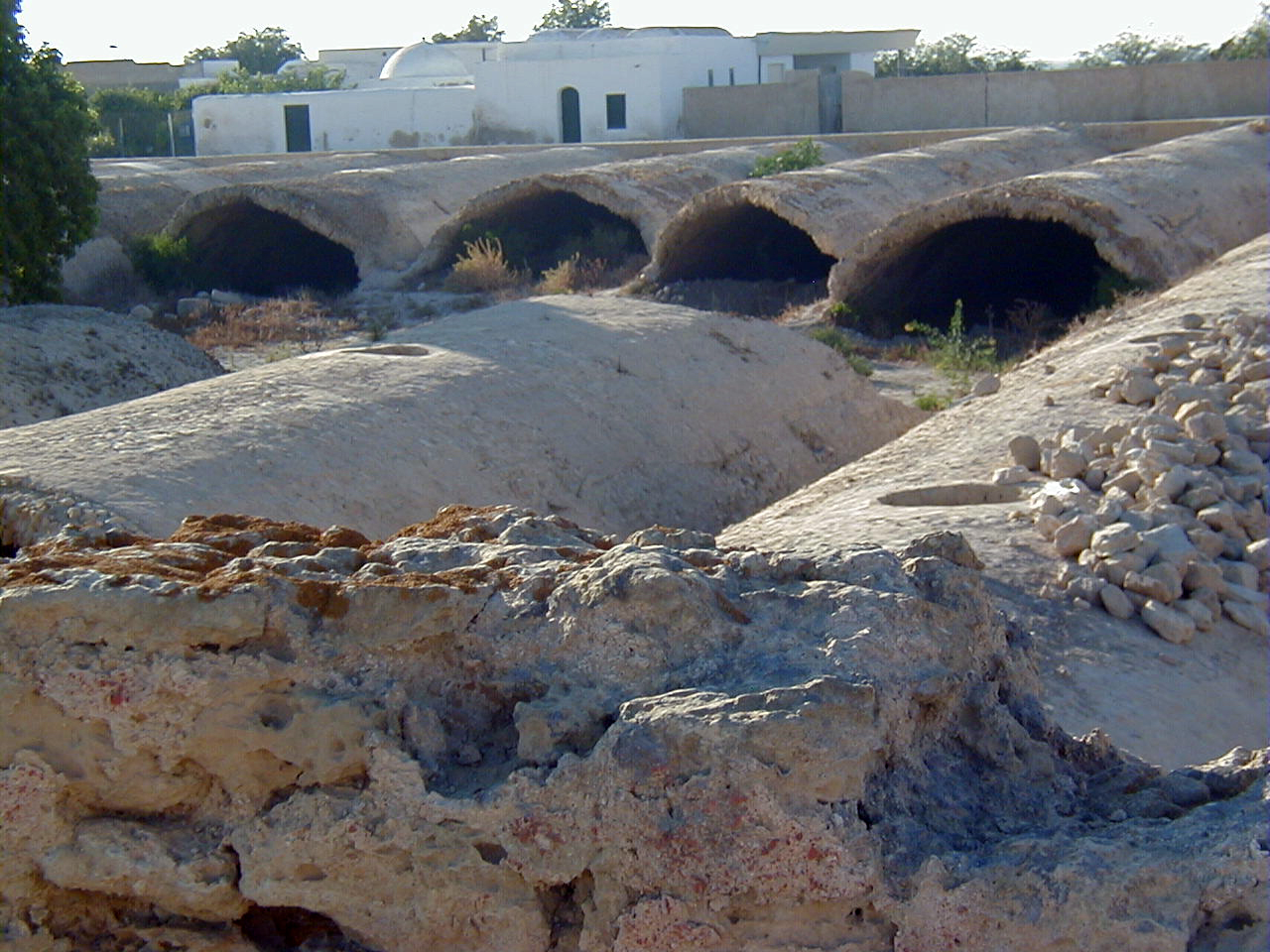
- View of the cisterns of La Malga

- 36.859279°N 10.318941°E
- Cultures: Ancient Roman
- Location: Tunis, Tunisia

UNESCO World Heritage Site
- Part of: Archaeological site of Carthage

The Cisterns of La Malga or Cisterns of La Mâalga are a group of cisterns, which are among the most visible features of the archaeological site of Carthage near Tunis, Tunisia. They are some of the best preserved Roman cisterns.

The cisterns, with a capacity of 50,000–60,000 m^{3} (1,800,000–2,100,000 cu ft), received water from a branch of the Zaghouan Aqueduct (exactly which branch remains uncertain). They were designed to provide the water supply for Carthage, the most important city of Africa Proconsulare during the High Empire, and especially to supply the Baths of Antoninus.

As part of the site of Carthage, the cisterns are classified as a World Heritage Site by UNESCO. On 17 February 2012, the Tunisian government proposed that the whole Zaghouan-Carthage Roman hydraulic complex, of which they are a part, should be classed as a world heritage site.

== History ==
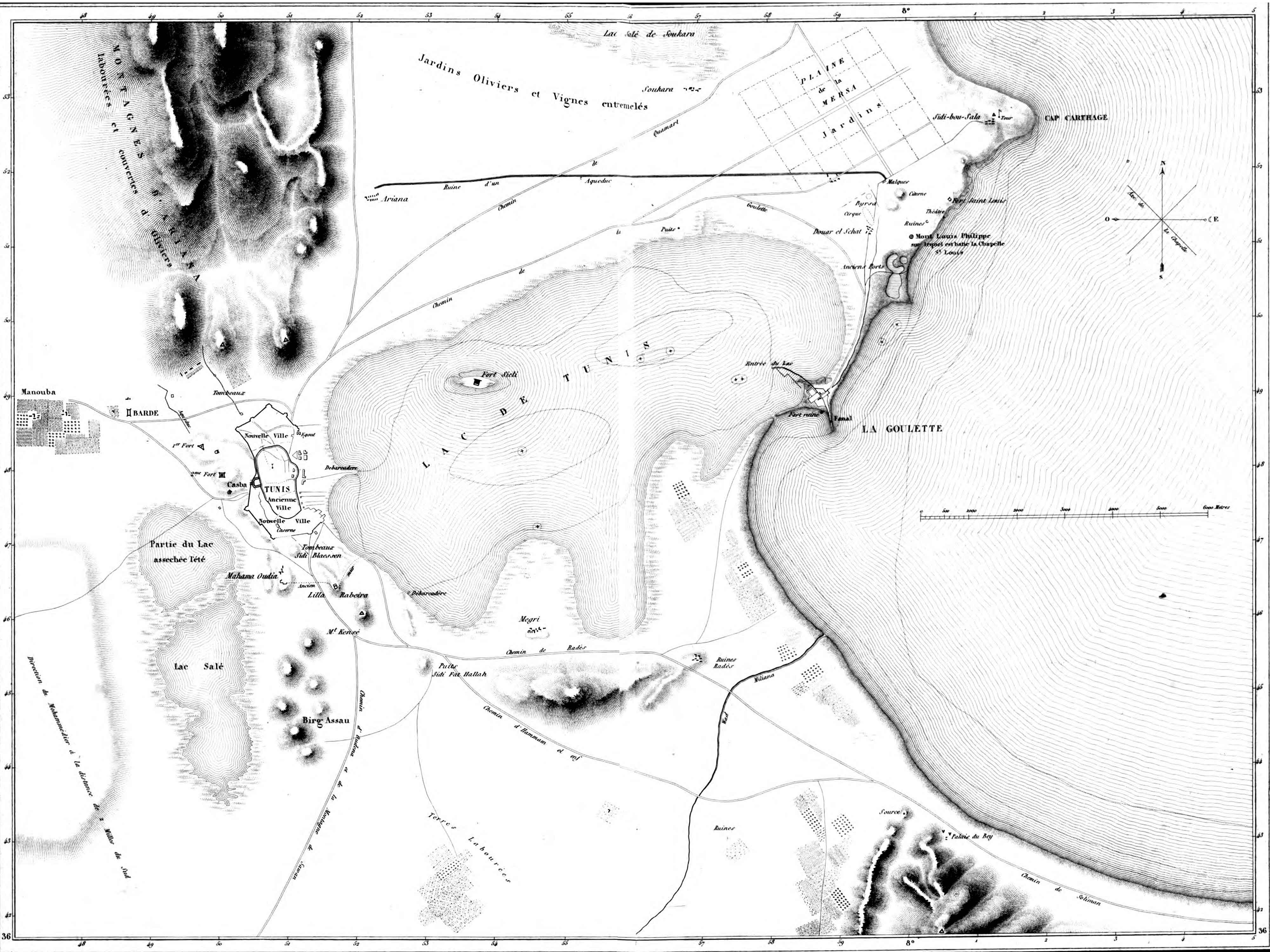
Map of aqueduct ruins (1838)

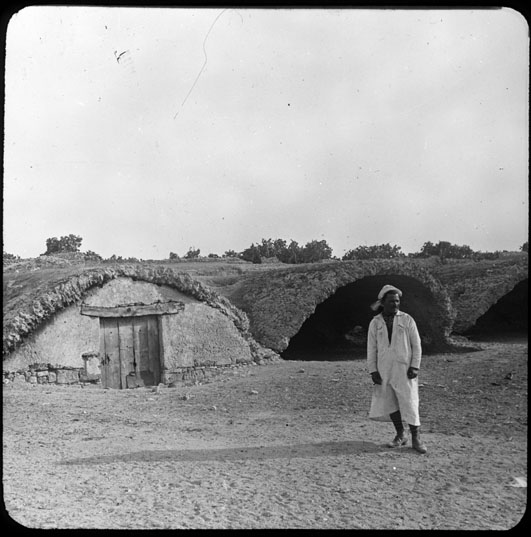
Old photograph of a repurposed cistern

The large, relatively well-preserved cisterns are located on the north side of the ancient Roman city. They were not the only largest cisterns of Carthage, but existed alongside others: the "basins of Hamilcar" and those located on the hill of Bordj Djedid.

From the Middle Ages, the cisterns were used as makeshift houses, stables, barns or cellars by the local populations; a practice which continued until the twentieth century. For a long time this prevented archaeological investigation of the complex.

According to Al Idrisi, there were at least 24 cisterns in a single line, each with a length of 130 pace and a width of 26 pace - though Henri Saladin considered this width too high. According to Christian Tuxen Falbe, there were fifteen cisterns which were 430 ft (130 m) in width and four ruined cisterns a little to the west and each of these nineteen cisterns had a length of 300 ft (91 m).

There is an active project to conserve and restore the site, and to develop a museum space devoted to it.

== Description ==
The group of cisterns forms a rectangular space measuring 127 m (417 ft) x 102 m (335 ft) (12,945 m^{2} (139,340 sq ft)). Each cistern is composed of a vaulted space, 102 m (335 ft) long, 7.4 m (24 ft) wide and 7 m (23 ft) high (excluding the vault), with a total capacity of 60,000 m^{3} (2,100,000 cu ft). There are fifteen individual cisterns, which are separated from one another and arranged in parallel.

Each vault has about ten circular openings. A cistern which distributed water to the others is aligned perpendicular to the others. A subsidiary aqueduct derived from the Zaghouan Aqueduct ran alongside the distribution cistern and supplied it with water through openings on its edge.

The presence of numerous circular openings on top of the each cistern's vault appear to be openings for water to escape through when the cisterns were too full or for collecting rain water. However, it is probable that the cisterns were actually surmounted by another level of tanks - in the same manner as Gallo-Roman two-story reservoirs.

The large cisterns were relied upon by the vast bath complex of Antoninus. The water flowed down from the cisterns to the baths through underground pipes.

In the immediate neighbourhood of the cisterns are other important sites: the cemetery of the officials, the villa of Scorpianus and some mausoleums, one of which has been re-constructed in a special room of the Bardo National Museum.

Plan of the cisterns

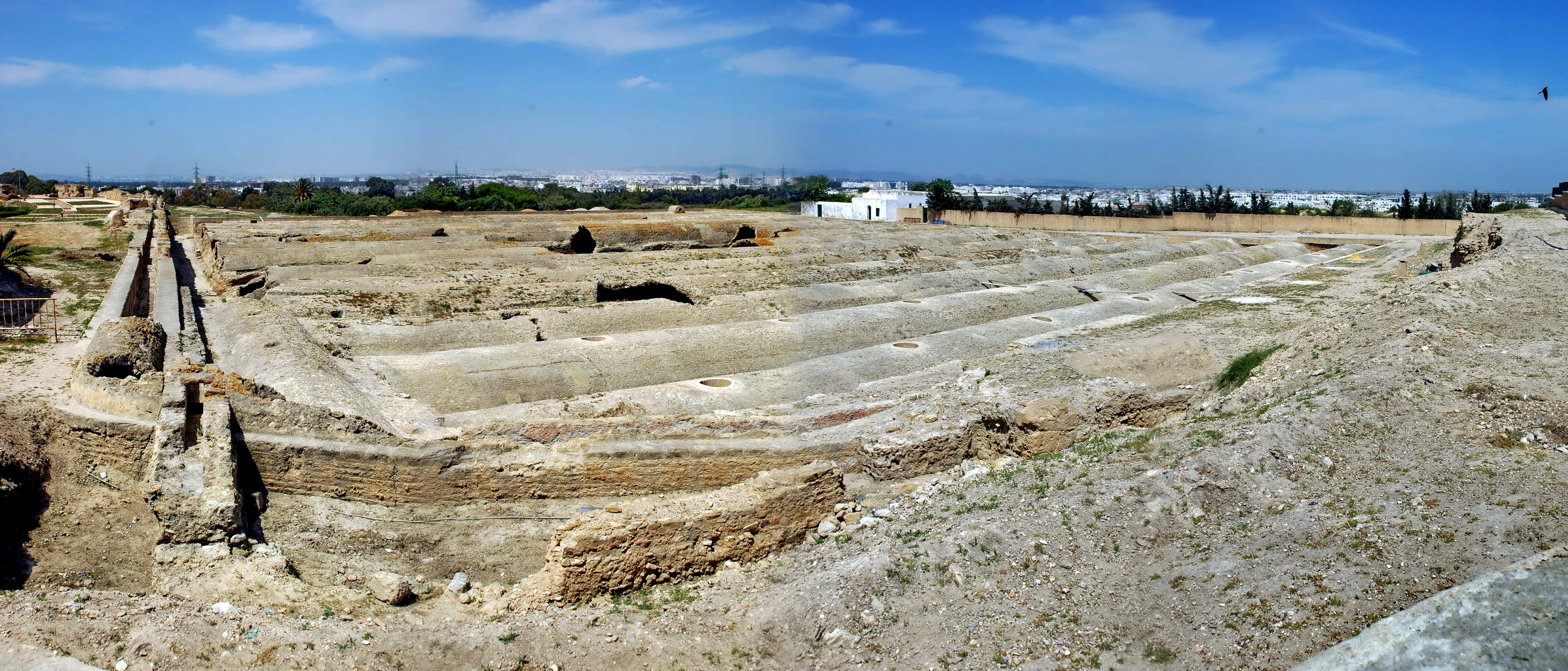
View of the cisterns

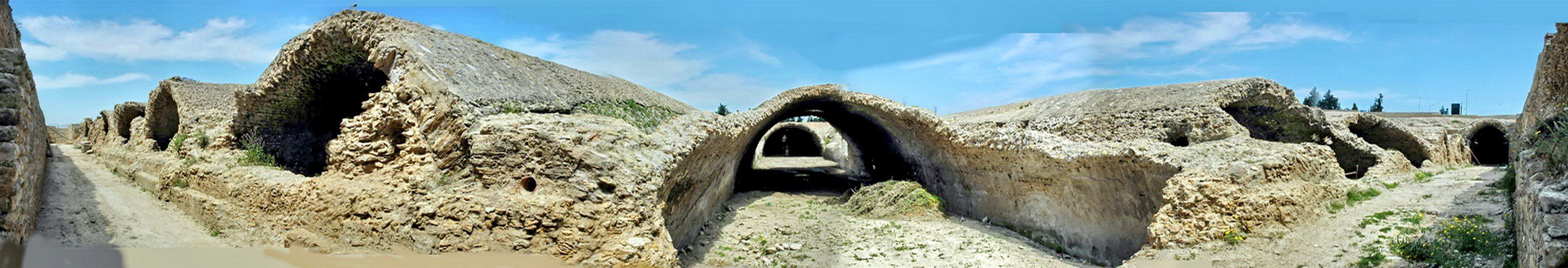
Panorama amongst the cisterns

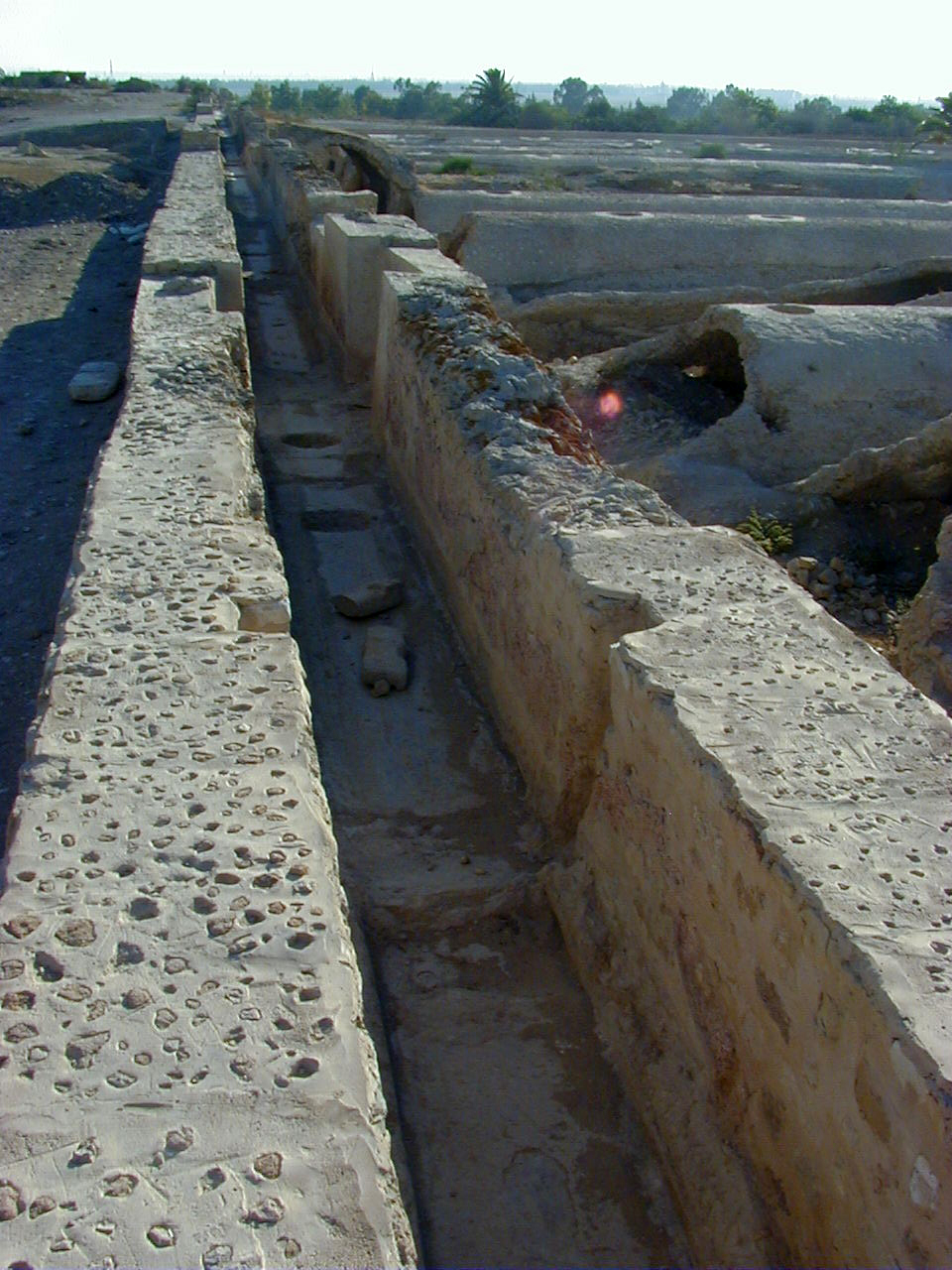
View of a pipe for bringing water from the aqueduct to the cisterns

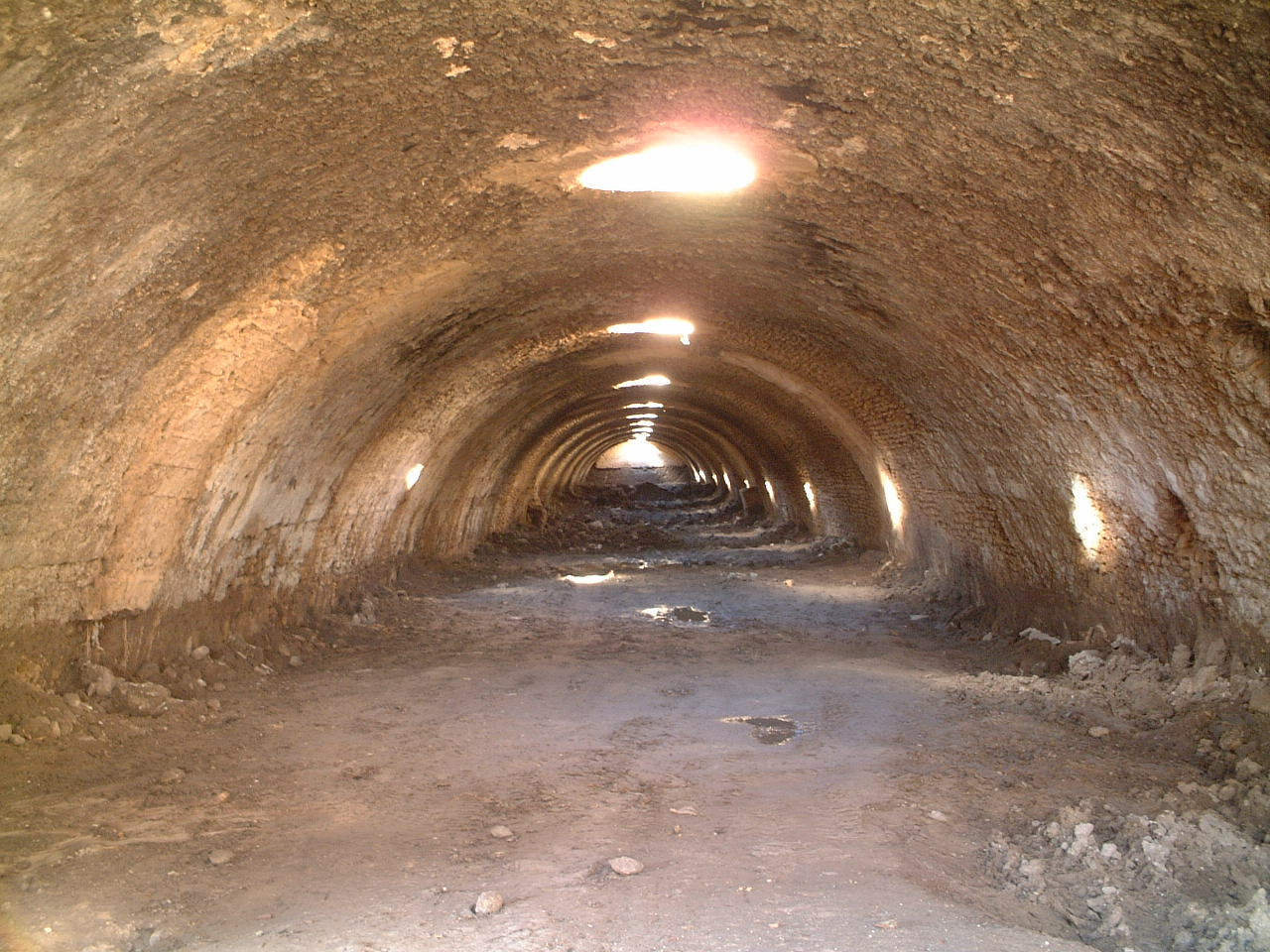
Interior of one of the cisterns

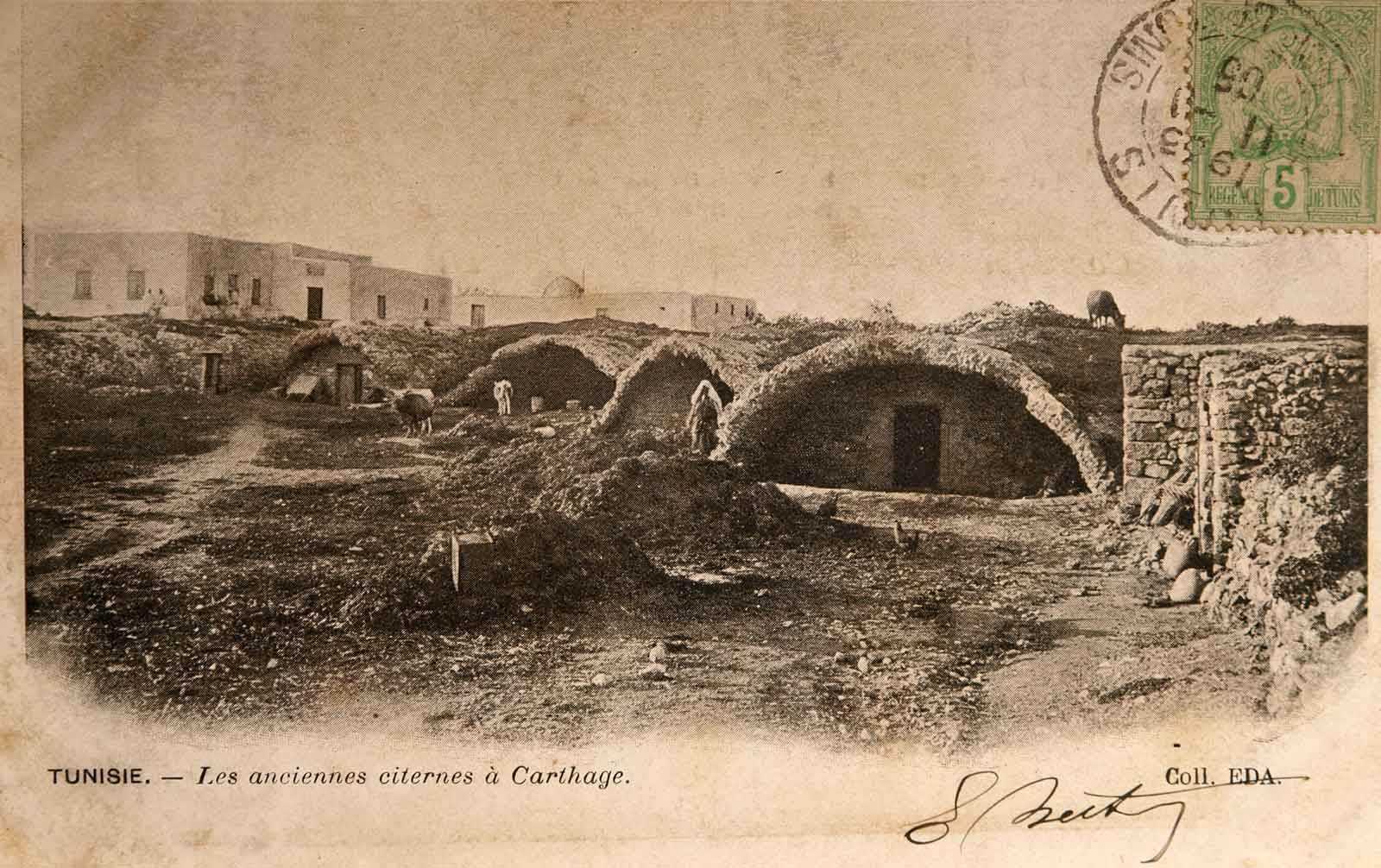
Old image of the repurposed cisterns

== See also ==
- List of Roman cisterns
- Carthage Punic Ports
