= Benhisa inscription =

Punic inscription

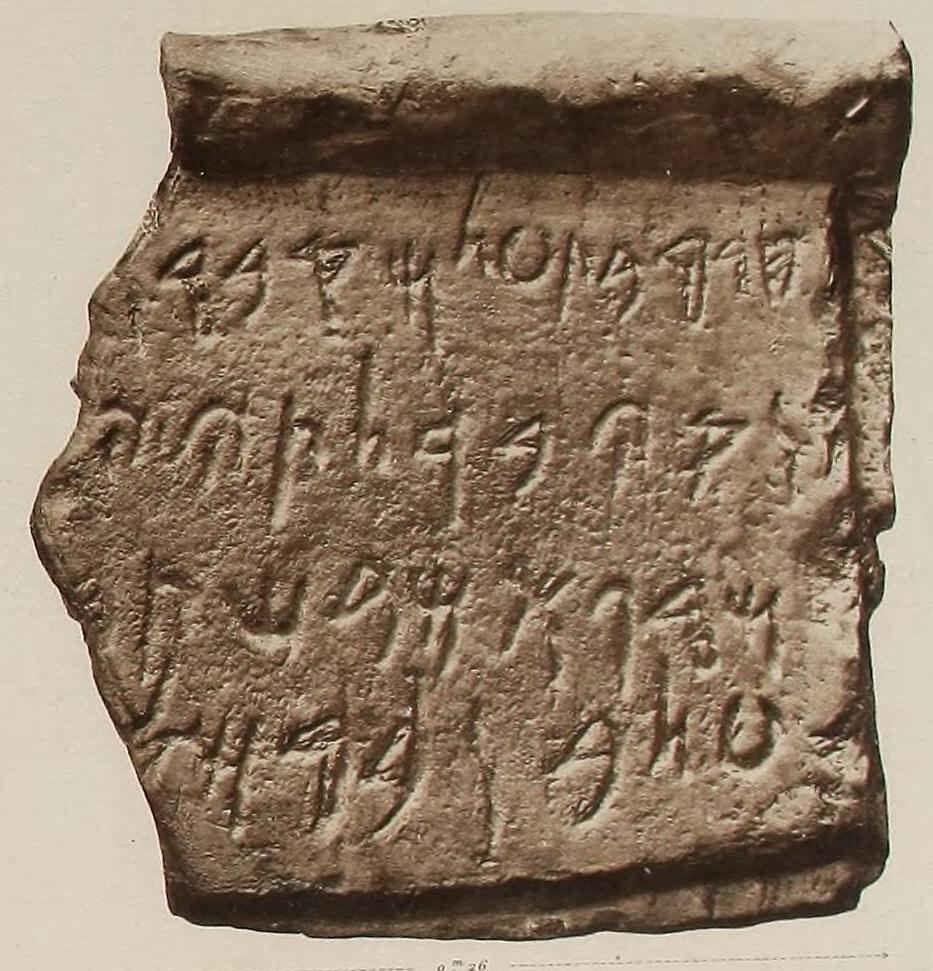
Benhisa inscription CIS I 124

The Benhisa inscription, CIS I 124, is Punic funeral inscription found in Malta in 1761. It mentions the name Hannibal, which garnered significant scholarly interest.

It is engraved on a block of stone measuring approximately 26 cm x 26 cm, containing four lines of which the end is missing (the left part was broken on its transfer to Paris).

It was sent to Paris in 1810 and it remains in the Cabinet des Médailles of the National Library.

== Discovery ==
The inscription was discovered in the region of Bengħisa (archaically spelt Benhisa), just south of Birżebbuġa, at the south-eastern tip of the island.

It was found in a cave-vault with whitewashed walls. The inscription was found in a niche carved in the rock, in the interior part of the cave, near where a corpse and a lamp had also been discovered.

== Publications ==
Multiple sketches were published:

- Abela, G.F. (1772). Malta illustrata... del commendatore F. Giovanfrancesco Abela,... corretta, accresciuta, e continovata dal conte Giovannantonio Ciantar,... con le piante di Malta, e della sua antica citta'... Malta illustrata... del commendatore F. Giovanfrancesco Abela,... corretta, accresciuta, e continovata dal conte Giovannantonio Ciantar,... con le piante di Malta, e della sua antica citta' (in Italian). per F. Giovanni Mallia. (pages 198-199 and 465–466)
  - Ciantar's copy was studied by Jean-Jacques Barthélémy, the decipherer of Phoenician, in Journal des Savants, December 1761, p. 871-872
- Swinton, John. “An Attempt to Explain a Punic Inscription, Lately Discovered in the Island of Malta. In a Letter to the Reverend Thomas Birch, D. D. Secret. R. S. from the Reverend John Swinton, B. D. of Christ-Church, Oxon. F. R. S. and Member of the Etruscan Academy of Cortona in Tuscany.” Philosophical Transactions (1683-1775) 53 (1763): 274–93. http://www.jstor.org/stable/105734.
- Castello, Gabriele Lancillotto (1769). Siciliae et objacentium insularum veterum inscriptionum nova collectio, prolegom. et notis illustrata (in Latin). cajet. Mar. Bentivenga. (pages 293 and p. 318 in the 1784 edition)
- Drummond, Willian (1810). An Essay on a Punic Inscription Found in the Island of Malta. A.J. Valpy [and] sold by W.H Lunn.

It does not appear in the Kanaanäische und Aramäische Inschriften or Cooke's Text-Book of North-Semitic Inscriptions.

== Bibliography ==
- An Eye for Form
