= Falbe Punic inscriptions =

Punic inscriptions in Tunisia

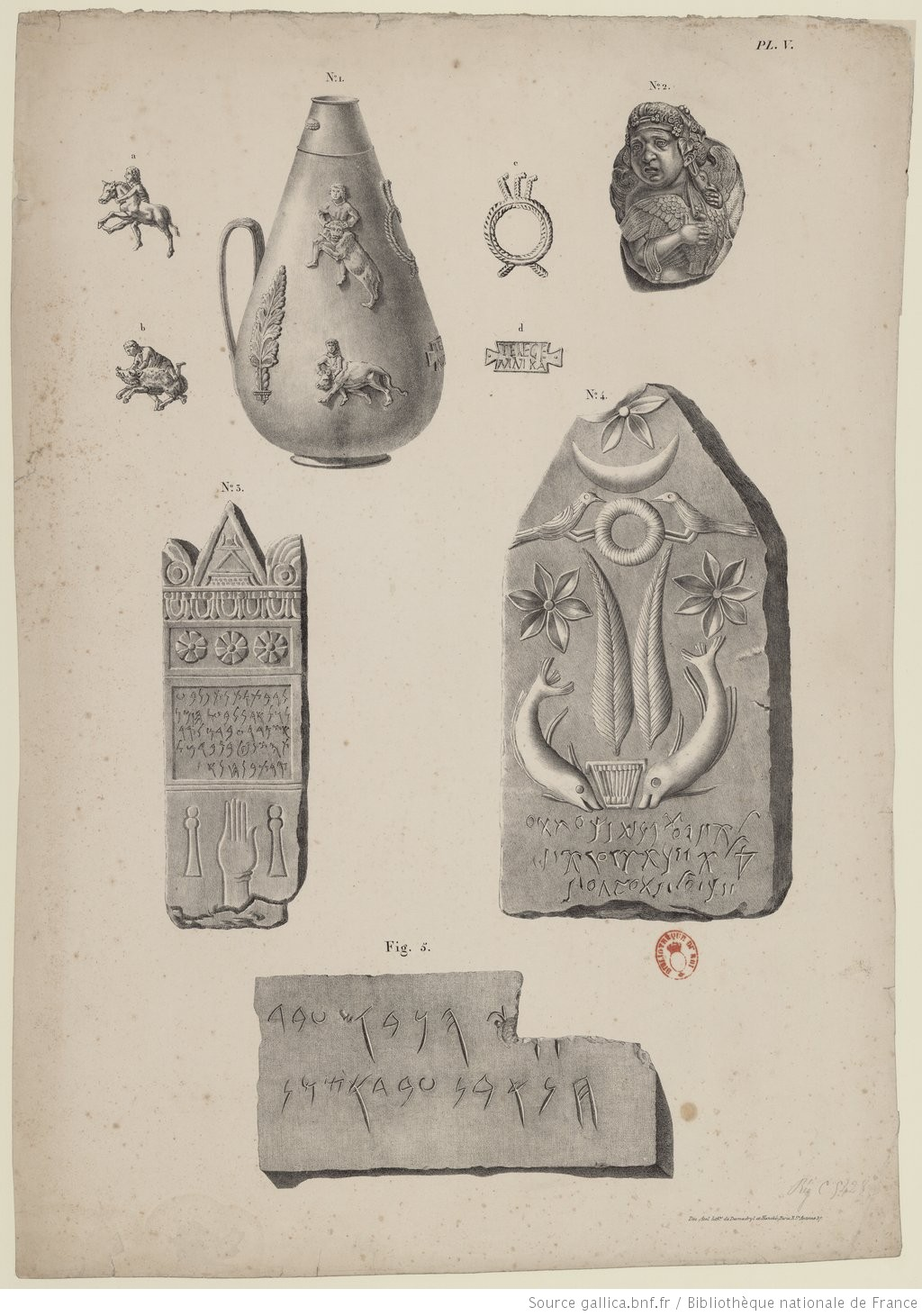
The steles as published by Falbe

The Falbe Punic inscriptions are three Punic inscriptions, found in Carthage by Christian Tuxen Falbe in 1833 in Husainid Tunisia. They were discovered by Denmark's consul to Tunis, von Scheel, near La Malga (Carthage).

They were published in his Recherches sur l'emplacement de Carthage.

== Carthaginian tombstones ==
The Carthaginian tombstone labelled number 3 in the image above is known in the National Museum of Denmark as NMD ABb 92, is known by the Corpus Inscriptionum Semiticarum as CIS I 199, and as “Falbe 1”. It was discovered von Scheel near La Malga (Carthage).

The rectangular block labelled number 5 came into the hands of Lancelot-Théodore Turpin de Crissé, and is today located in the Logis Pincé museum in Angers, France, with ID number 293-2. It was also discovered near La Malga (Carthage).

Another Carthaginian tombstone was subsequently donated to the National Museum of Denmark by Falbe, although this was not published in his original 1833 publication. It is known as NMD ABb 149; later the Corpus Inscriptionum Semiticarum labeled it CIS I 438, and as “Falbe 2”.

== Neo-Punic inscription ==
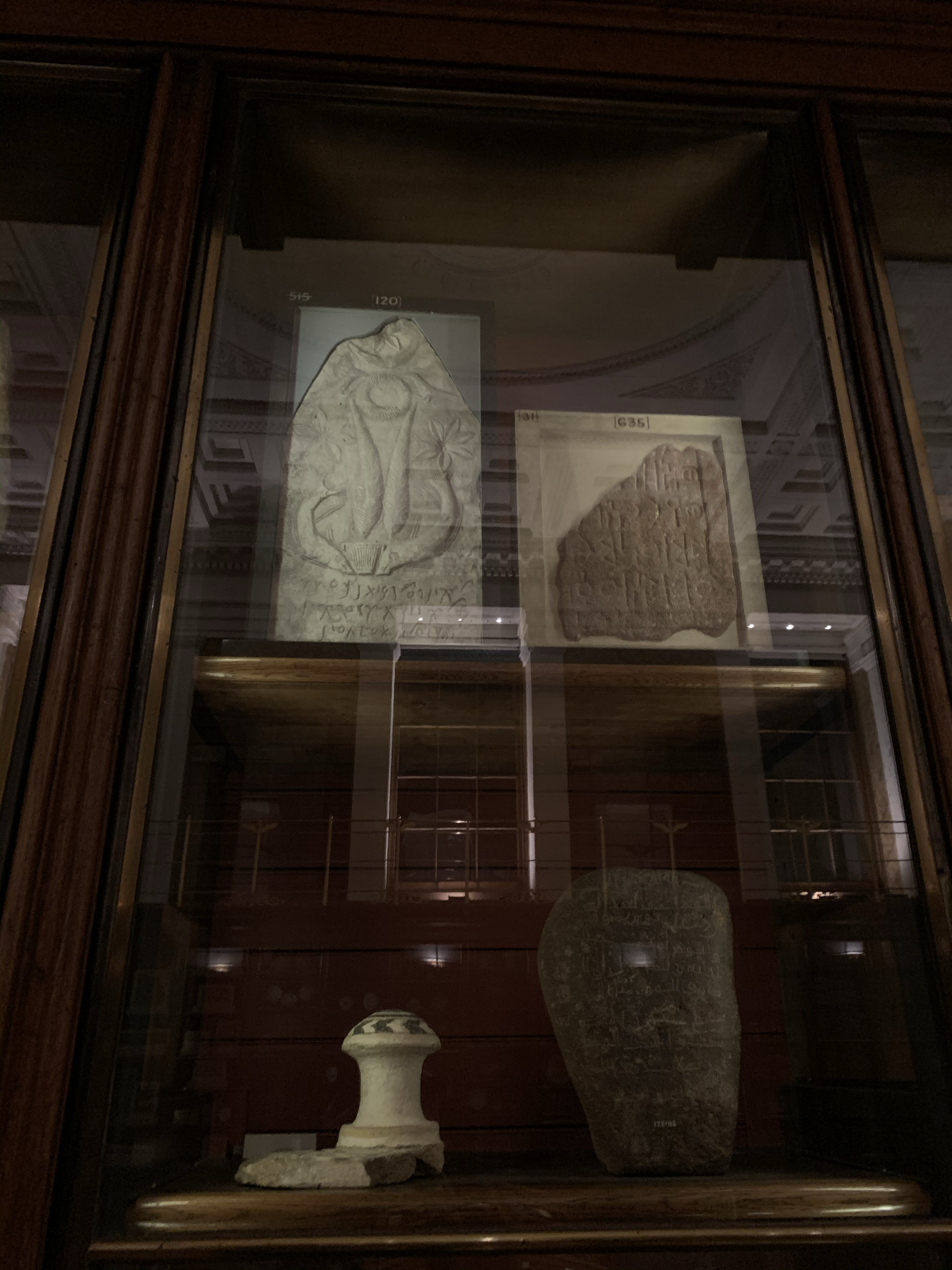
The copy of the Neo-Punic text in the British Museum

The inscriptions labelled number 4 in the image above is Neo-Punic. Falbe wrote that it was discovered “near Meteda, a village between Béja and El Kef”. It is held in the National Museum of Denmark (NMD ABb 91) with a cast in the Rijksmuseum van Oudheden (RMO CF*7 CAa9) and a copy in the British Museum (BM C.211)

== Bibliography ==
- "TABULA TITULORUM VOTIVORUM; TANITIDI ET BAALI HAMMONI DICATORUM (180-3251.)". Corpus inscriptionum semiticarum (in Latin). Académie des Inscriptions et Belles-Lettres. 1890.
- Christian Tuxen Falbe, Recherches sur l'emplacement de Carthage
