= Wilhelm Gesenius =

German orientalist and theologian (1786–1842)

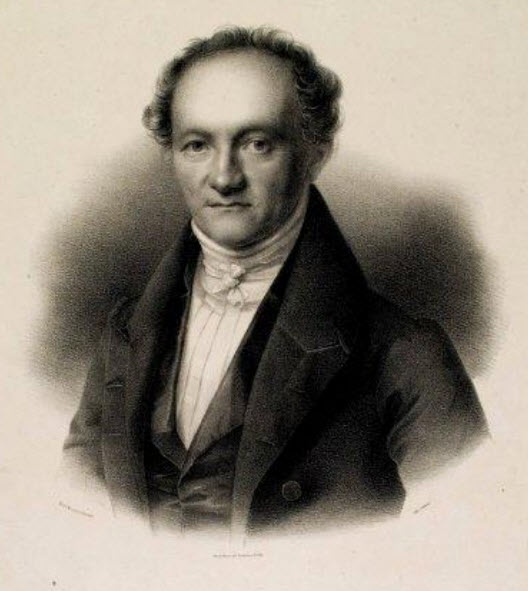
- Born: 3 February 1786; Nordhausen
- Died: 23 October 1842 (aged 56); Halle, Saxony, Prussia

Academic background
- Education: University of Helmstedt; University of Göttingen

Academic work
- Discipline: Christian theology Biblical Hebrew; Oriental studies
- Sub-discipline: Lutheran theology Phoenician studies
- Institutions: University of Halle
- Notable works: Scripturae Linguaeque Phoeniciae

Heinrich Friedrich Wilhelm Gesenius (3 February 1786 – 23 October 1842) was a German orientalist, lexicographer, Christian Hebraist, Lutheran theologian, Biblical scholar and critic.

== Early life and education ==
Gesenius was born in Nordhausen. In 1803, he became a student of philosophy and theology at the University of Helmstedt, where Heinrich Henke was his most influential teacher; but the latter part of his university course was taken at Göttingen, where Johann Eichhorn and Thomas Tychsen were then at the height of their popularity. In 1806, shortly after graduation, he became Repetent and Privatdozent (or Magister legens) at Göttingen; and, as he was later proud to say, had August Neander for his first pupil in Hebrew language.

== Career ==
On 8 February 1810, he became professor extraordinarius in theology, and on 16 June 1811 was promoted to ordinarius, at the University of Halle, where, in spite of many offers of high preferment elsewhere, he spent the rest of his life.

He taught with great regularity for over thirty years. He was a gifted lecturer whose lectures were so interesting that his lecture room was consistently filled; by 1810 his lectures were attended by more than 500 students – nearly half the student population of the university. The only interruptions occurred in 1813–1814, occasioned by the German War of Liberation (War of the Sixth Coalition), during which the university was closed, and those occasioned by two prolonged literary tours, first in 1820 to Paris, London and Oxford with his colleague Johann Thilo (1794–1853) for the examination of rare oriental manuscripts, and in 1835 to England and the Netherlands in connection with his Phoenician studies. He became the most popular teacher of Hebrew and of Old Testament introduction and exegesis in Germany; during his later years his lectures were attended by nearly five hundred students. Among his pupils the most eminent were Peter von Bohlen, C. P. W. Gramberg, A. G. Hoffmann, Hermann Hupfeld, Emil Rödiger, J. C. F. Tuch, J. K. W. Vatke and Theodor Benfey.

His first Hebrew lexicon (with German text) was worked up during the winter of 1806–1807, and published a few years later by F. C. W. Vogel, whose printing house in Leipzig thereafter published all the editions of his lexicons. This was followed by a somewhat abridged version (about half the bulk of the first lexicon but with significant improvements) in 1815, which went to four German editions (each substantially larger and improved than its previous editions) and one Latin edition (although intended merely as a translation of the German edition, this too was a reworked revisions). His large lexicon of Biblical Hebrew and Chaldee (Aramaic) was first published in 1829, and its revision and expansion, under the editorship of Rödiger, continued after Gesenius's death until 1858. His textbook on Hebrew grammar first appeared, as a small book of a mere 202 pages, in 1813, and went through 13 editions in Gesenius's lifetime and as many afterward. He also published some smaller works, in German, on the grammatical anomalies found in the Hebrew text of the Old Testament. He also wrote extensively on the Samaritans and their version of the Pentateuch, and on the Phoenicians and their language, most notably with the publication of Scripturae Linguaeque Phoeniciae.

In 1827, after declining an invitation to take Eichhorn's place at Göttingen, Gesenius was made a Consistorialrat. In 1830 there were violent verbal attacks to which he, along with his friend and colleague Julius Wegscheider, were subjected by Ernst Hengstenberg and his party in the Evangelische Kirchenzeitung, on account of his rationalism and his lecture comments treating lightly the Biblical accounts of miracles. He was thereafter troubled with personal stresses; in 1833, he nearly died of lung disease, in 1835 three of his children died, and subsequently he was tormented by various physical complaints. His death in 1842 came after prolonged misery from gall stones. There is however some discrepancy as to how many of Gesenius's children died before their father.

== Death ==
Gesenius died at Halle and is buried near the university. According to tradition, theology students in Halle put stones on his grave as a token of respect every year before their examinations.

== Legacy ==
Gesenius takes much of the credit for having freed Semitic philology from the trammels of theological and religious prepossession, and for inaugurating the strictly scientific (and comparative) method which has since been so fruitful. As an exegete he exercised a powerful influence on theological investigation. He may also be considered as a founder of Phoenician studies. Gesenius was keenly aware of previous efforts at dictionaries of Biblical Hebrew (he provided an extensive survey of Hebrew lexicography in the 1823 edition of his Hebrew lexicon for schools), and, compared to previous lexicons which had simply translated Hebrew expressions as whatever other versions (primarily the Septuagint and the Vulgate) had in the same verses, his own contribution to that field was the inclusion of insights obtained from the study of other languages, ancient and non-semitic. From his extensive body of work, the products most familiar to modern English-speaking readers are his Hebrew Grammar, best represented by an English translation of the 28th German edition, published by Oxford University Press in 1910, and his dictionary of Biblical Hebrew and Aramaic, known through a number of English translations, including the Gesenius's Hebrew and Chaldee Lexicon to the Old Testament Scriptures, a 1853 edition revised by Samuel Prideaux Tregelles and the Brown–Driver–Briggs, a 1907 edition revised by Francis Brown, Samuel Driver, and Charles Briggs. As indicated by the title pages, the German editions of these works were carried forward by several revised editions, after Gesenius's death, by other scholars, most conspicuously Emil Rödiger. The newest edition is the 18th which was published in 2013.

Edward Robinson, an acquaintance of Gesenius, and his principal English translator and biographer, said of him,

So clear were his own conception, that he never uttered a sentence, no scarcely ever wrote one, which even the dullest intellect did not at once comprehend. In this respect, he may be said to stand out almost alone among modern German scholars. ... In all that fell within the proper sphere of his own researches, he never rested upon the authority of others, but investigated for himself, with all the minute accuracy and closeness of detail and unwearied industry for which German learning is celebrated. His one great object was philological truth. He had no preconceived theories, to the support of which he was at all hazards committed, and in connection with which only he sought for truth. These traits, combined with his extensive learning, inspired a confidence in his researches and opinions on topics connected with Hebrew philology, such as has been bestowed on few scholars.

== Works ==
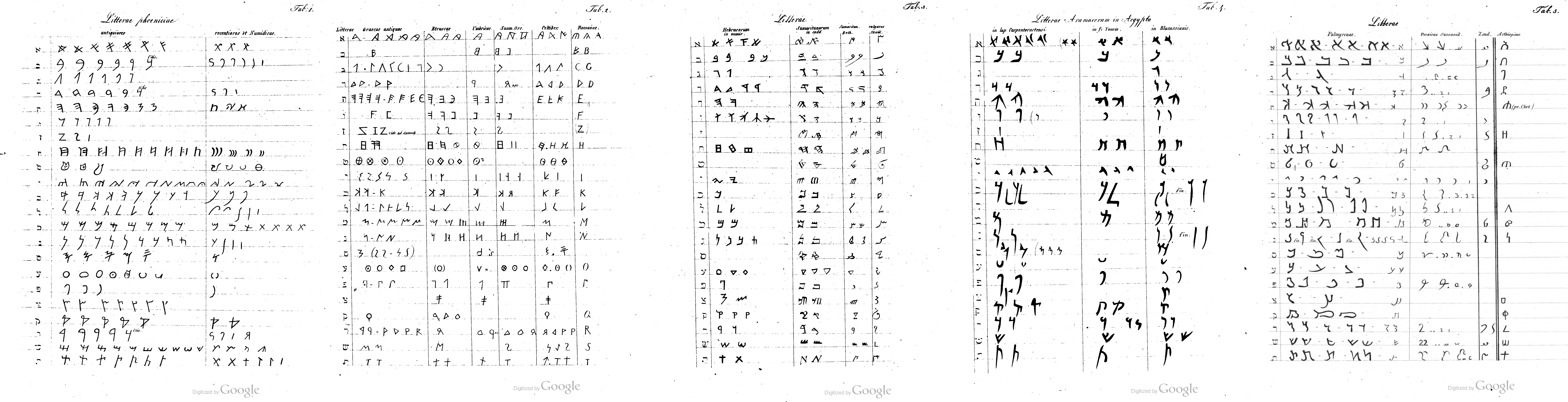
Comparison tables in Gesenius's 1837 Scripturae Linguaeque Phoeniciae

- Versuch über die maltesische Sprache (1810).
- Hebräisches Lesebuch (1814).
- De Pentateuchi Samaritani origine, indole et auctoriate (1815).
- Geschichte der hebräischen Sprache und Schrift (1815).
- Hebräisch-deutsches Handwörterbuch, 2 vols. (1810–12). English translation by Leo (1825–1828).
  - Hebräisches und chaldäisches Handwörterbuch über das Alte Testament (1815; 18th ed. 2013). After the tenth edition chaldäisches was changed into aramäisches. Various editions of this work have been translated into English by Gibbs (1824, 1827, 1832), Robinson (1836, 1854), and Tregelles (1859).
    - Brown–Driver–Briggs (2nd ed. 1907; corrected impression 1963) is based on Gesenius's work.
- Hebräische Grammatik (1813, 29th ed. 1929 by Gotthelf Bergsträsser [incomplete]). English translation by Arthur E. Cowley (2nd ed. 1910).
- Ausführliches grammatisch-kritisches Lehrgebäude der hebräischen Sprache mit Vergleichung der verwandten Dialekte (1817).
- De Samaritanorum theologia ex fontibus ineditis commentatio (1822).
- Paläographische Studien über Phönizische und Punische Schrift (1835).
- Scripturae Linguaeque Phoeniciae (1837).
- Programma. Commentatio de Samaritanorum theologia (1824).
- Carmina samaritana e Codicibus Londinensibus et Gothanis (1824).
- Programma. De inscriptione phoenicio-graeca in Cyrenaica (1825).
- Genesis, Hebraice ad optima exemplaria accuratissime expressa (1828).
- Der Prophet Jesaia, 3 vols. (1820–21, 2nd ed. 1829).
- Liber Job ad optima exemplaria accuratissime expressus (1829).
- Thesaurus philologicus criticus linguae Hebraeae et Chaldaeae veteris testamenti, 3 vols. (started in 1829, completed posthumously by Emil Rödiger in 1858). Contains references to talmudic works and Jewish Bible commentators such as Rashi, Abraham ibn Ezra, David Kimhi.
- Disputatio de inscriptione punico-libyca (1835).
- De Bar Alio et Bar Bahlulo, 2 vols. (1834–39).
- Über die Himjaritische Sprache und Schrift (1841).

Gesenius also contributed extensively to Ersch and Gruber's Encyclopädie, and enriched the German translation of Johann Ludwig Burckhardt's Travels in Syria and the Holy Land with valuable geographical notes. For many years he also edited the Halle Allgemeine Litteraturzeitung. A sketch of his life was published by Rudolf Haym in 1843 (Gesenius: eine Erinnerung für seine Freunde), and another by Hermann Gesenius, Wilhelm Gesenius, ein Erinnerungsblatt an den hundertjährigen Geburtstag am 3. Februar 1886, in 1886.
