= Hendrik Arent Hamaker =

Dutch orientalist (1789–1835)

- Born: February 25, 1789; Amsterdam, Dutch Republic
- Died: October 7, 1835 (aged 46); Nederlangbroek, Netherlands
- Education: Athenaeum Illustre, Amsterdam
- Occupations: philologist, Orientalist
- Spouse: Johanna Camper

Hendrik Arent Hamaker (25 February 1789 in Amsterdam – 7 October 1835 in Nederlangbroek) was a Dutch Assyriologist, philologist and orientalist. He studied most European and Asian languages, and the history and geography of the East. He was an associate of the orientalist Johannes Hendricus van der Palm, and Theodor Juynboll was among his pupils.

== Life ==
Hamaker's father intended him for a career in business, however his evident intelligence and keen interest in ancient languages from an early age led patrons to sponsor his education at the prestigious Atheneaeum Illustre of his native Amsterdam, to study classical and oriental languages. There, under the tutelage of professors van Lennep and Wilmett he, though far from abandoning classical languages (especially ancient and byzantine Greek), focused on oriental studies.

In 1815–1817 he was professor of Oriental languages at the Athenaeum of Franeker (formerly the University of Franeker), and lectured on Arabic, Chaldean and Syriac. From 1817–1822 he held the post of "extraordinary" professor Oriental languages and title of Interpres Legati Warneriani (Interpreter of the legacy of Levinus Warner) at Leiden University. In 1820 Hamaker published his Specimen of a catalog of oriental manuscripts of Warner's bequest, which included descriptions of the Futuh (Conquests) of Baladhuri, a section of Al-Tabari's great history, the Murudj al-Dhahab (Fields of Gold) of Al-Masudi, etc. In 1822 Hamaker became full professor of Oriental languages (especially Arabic), (1822–1835).

Hamaker belonged to a number of learned institutions and, in 1829, was honored with a knighthood of the Order of the Netherlands Lion. He spent his life of forty-six years in tireless literary inquiry. Through his lectures and writings he pioneered studies of eastern literature and languages throughout Europe and beyond. Hamaker was the first Dutch scholar to give a series of eight public lectures (in 1834; published 1835) on the comparison of Greek, Latin and the Germanic languages with Sanskrit, thus instigating (though not establishing) the study of Indo-European comparative linguistics in Holland.

He died at the family's summer residence Rhodesteyn, near the village of Nederlangbroek, nine days after his wife Johanna Camper (granddaughter of Petrus Camper), on the 7th of October 1835. Like some of their seven children, both parents had contracted scarlet fever to the consequences of which both succumbed. They were buried at the churchyard of Nederlangbroek. All of the seven children survived into adulthood.

== Orations ==
- Graecis Latinisque historicis medii aevi, ex ortentalibus fontibus illustrandis.(1815)
- The religione Mohammedica, magno virtutis bellicae apud Orientales incitamento.(1817)
- vita et meritis Guilielmi Jonesii. (life and works of William Jones)(28th Sept 1822) (Note: For three mentioned speeches see The Light; the first in the Annales Academiae Groninganae, the latter in the Annales Academiae Lugduno-Batavae.)

== Works ==
Hamaker contributed to Siegenbeek's Museum and Kampen's Magazijn, and also contributed to the 2nd part of Van Kampen's Dutch translation of J. von Muller's Algemeene Geschiedenis (General History) and published reviews in the Bibliotheca Critica nova. (Note: Bibliotheca Critica nova,(1825) pp. 7, 339, 457) Among his reviews of Eastern literature, his review of a work by von Hammer, prompted a hostile reaction.

Among his treatises, works and numerous memoirs included in various collections are the following:

- Oratio of religione muhammedica (Leiden, 1817–1818);
- Specimen catalogi codicum mss. orientalium libræca academiæ Lugduno Balavz (Leiden 1820. 4o.), with comments and notes; (1820) Publisher; Lugduni Batavorum: Apud S. and J. Luchtmans (Latin / Arabic) (archive.org)
- Diatribe philologico-critica, Monumentorum aliquot Punicorum, nuper in Africa repertorum, interpretationem exhibens, cet. (Lugd. Bat. [Leiden] 1822. 4o.)
- Commentalio ad locum Taky Eddini al Makrizi of expeditionibus to Græcis Francisque adversus Dimyatham (Amsterdam 1824, in-40), a book full of research;
- Takyoddini Ahmedis al-Makrizii narratio of expeditionibus to Graecis ... by Aḥmad ibn'Alī Maqrīzī (مقريزي, أحمد بن علي), Hendrik Arent Hamaker; (1824) Publisher; apud Pieper & Ipenbuur; (archive.org)
- Miscellanea Phoenica (Leid. 1828, 4o);
- Academic readings on the usefulness and importance of the grammatical comparison of Greek, Latin and Germanic tongues with Sanskrit (Leid. 1835. 8o.)
- Claudianus nostrorum temporum vates. (Claudian the Poet of our Century); Amst. 1814. 8o. (Note: History of Bonaparte in Latin verse from Claudianus; compiled by L. A. Decampo with Hamaker's Dutch translation opposite.)
- Lectiones Philostrataeae, Lugd. Bat. 1816. 8o.
- Treatise on the religious, moral and social influence of poetry; in the Mnemosyne, vol. III. (Dordr 1817. 8o.) (Note: About the Sakontala of the Indian poet Calidas in the Mnemosyne, D. XII. (Dordr 1823. 8o.))
- Commentatio ad locum Takyoddini Ahmedis Al-Makrizi the expeditionibus a Graecis Francisque adversus Dimyatham, ab anno Christi 702–1221, susceptis, (Amstel. 1824. 4o.)
- Incerti auctoris liber de expugnatione Memphidis et Alexandriae, (Lugd. Bat. 1825. 4o.) [an edition of the كتاب فتوح مصر falsely-attributed to Al-Waqidi]
- Lettre à M. Raoul Rochette sur une inscription en caractères Phéniciens et Grecs, découverte à Cyrène, (Leid. 1825. 4o.)
- Réflexions critiques sur quelques points contestés de l'histoire orientale; pour de réponse aux éclaircissements de M. de Hammer, published in le Nouveau Journal Asiatique, issue April 1829. 1829. 8o.)
- On the nature of Independence, the disposition of peoples and persons, and necessity for the Netherlands, (Orat.) (Leid. 1831. 8o.)
- Specimen criticum, exhibitions locos Ibn Khacanis de Ibn Zeidouno, ex codicibus Bibliothecae Lugd. Batav. et Gothanae editos. (Lugd. Bat. 1832. 4o.) (Note: Hendrik Engelinus Weyers, 1831) (Note: Genealogy of Ibn Zaydūn, Aḥmad ibn ʻAbd Allāh, (1003 or 1004-1071))
- Commentatio in libr. the vita et morte Prophetarum, qui Graece circumfertur, cet. (Amst. 1833. 4o.)
- Comments about the Samaritans and their correspondence with some European scholars: on the occasion of the publication of a still unknown Samaritan letter; placed in Kist and Royaards, Archive for Church. Gesch. D. V. (Leid. 1834. 8o.)
- Miscellanea samaritana, posthumous work, etc.

== Sources ==
Great Universal Dictionary of the Nineteenth Century
