= 410th =

410th may refer to:

- 410th Air Expeditionary Operations Group, provisional United States Air Force unit assigned to Air Combat Command
- 410th Air Expeditionary Wing (410 AEW), provisional United States Air Force unit assigned to Air Combat Command
- 410th Bombardment Squadron, inactive United States Air Force unit
- 410th Canadian Tactical Fighter Training Squadron, nicknamed the "Cougars", a Royal Canadian Air Force aircraft squadron, Cold Lake, Alberta
- 410th Fighter Squadron or 195th Fighter Squadron flies the F-16C Block 25 Fighting Falcon
- 410th Flight Test Squadron (410 FLTS) was part of the 412th Test Wing based at Edwards Air Force Base, California
- 410th Support Brigade (United States), support brigade of the United States Army

== See also ==
- 410 (number)
- 410 (disambiguation)
- 410, the year 410 (CDX) of the Julian calendar
- 410 BC
