= 410 (disambiguation) =

410 and 410 BC are years.

410 may also refer to:

- .410 bore, the smallest caliber of shotgun shell commonly available
- 410 (song), a song by Sidhu Moose Wala
- List of highways numbered 410
- Area codes 410 and 443
- Locust bean gum food additive
- Messerschmitt Me 410 German combat aircraft during World War 2
- The HTTP status code "410 Gone", to indicate that the resource requested is no longer available

== See also ==
- 410th (disambiguation)
- 4/10 (disambiguation)
