= 104 =

104 may refer to:

- 104 (number), the natural number following 103 and preceding 105
- AD 104, a year in the 2nd century AD
- 104 BC, a year in the 2nd century BC
- Route 104 (MBTA), a bus route in Massachusetts, US
- Hundred and Four (or Council of 104), a Carthaginian tribunal of judges
- 104 (City of Edinburgh) Field Squadron, Royal Engineers, a Scottish military unit
- 104 (Tyne) Army Engineer Regiment, Royal Engineers, an English military unit
- 104 (barge), cargo ship in service in the 1890s
- 104 Klymene, a main-belt asteroid
- Peugeot 104, a supermini car
- Italian Disability Law 104/1992

== See also ==
- 10/4 (disambiguation)
- Rutherfordium, chemical element with atomic number 104
- One-O-Four, model of automobile manufactured by the Daimler Motor Company
