= 10/4 =

10/4 may refer to:

- October 4 (month-day date notation)
- April 10 (day-month date notation)
- 10 shillings and 4 pence in UK predecimal currency
- 10/4, a type of metre or time signature, with ten beats to the bar

== See also ==
- 104 (disambiguation)
- 4/10 (disambiguation)
