= 2/5 =

2/5 or 2/5 may refer to:

- February 5 (month-day date notation)
- 2 May (day-month date notation)
- 2nd Battalion, 5th Marines
- The fraction, two fifths

== See also ==
- 4/10 (disambiguation)
