= 4/10 =

4/10 may refer to:

- April 10 (month-day date notation)
- October 4 (day-month date notation)
- The fraction 2/5, written in tenths

== See also ==
- 2/5 (disambiguation)
- 10/4 (disambiguation)
- 410 (disambiguation)
