= Christian Tuxen Falbe =

Danish naval officer, archaeologist, explorer, cartographer and diplomat

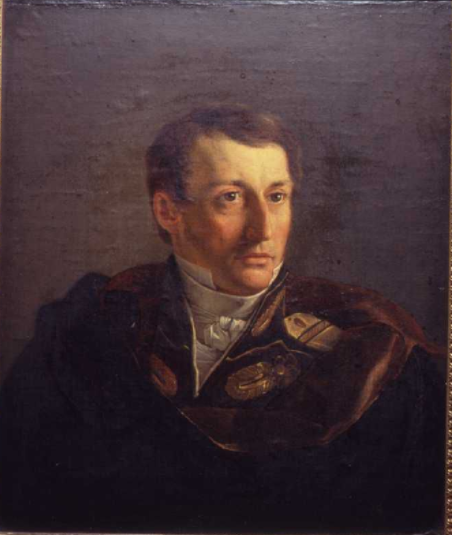
Christian Tuxen Falbe

Christian Tuxen Falbe (5 April 1791 – 19 July 1849) was a Danish naval officer, archaeologist, explorer, cartographer and diplomat.

== Biography ==
Falbe was born at Helsingør. He was the son of Ulrik Anton Falbe (1746–1795), an inspector at Øresund Custom House and the father of the diplomat Christian Frederik Falbe (1828–1896).

In 1807, he became a second lieutenant. He was appointed lieutenant-lieutenant in 1815. By 1820, he became a lieutenant-captain.

He was a consul to the Beylik of Tunis between 1821 and 1831. In 1833, he was relocated to Greece. Between 1837–38, he undertook a voyage in the Algerian provinces of Constantine and Tunis. In 1838, he participated in a scientific expedition to study the ruins of Carthage. He was the first to perform an archaeological survey on the site of Carthage and the first to produce a modern map of Tunis. In 1841, he resigned as a vessel commander-in-chief. From 1842, he was director of the king's collections at Amalienborg and, from 1847, director of the royal coin cabinet at Rosenborg Castle.

In 1813, he received the Knights' Cross of the Order of the Dannebrog.

He died in 1849 and was buried at Holmen Cemetery (Holmens Kirkegård) in Copenhagen.

== Bibliography ==
- Recherches sur l’emplacement de Carthage (planches), Paris, Imprimé par autorisation du roi à l'Imprimerie Royale, Paris, Service historique de la Défense, Archives du département de la Marine, 1833
- Description du plan de Tunis et de Carthage, Copenhague, Service historique de la Défense, Département de l'armée de terre, 1-M 1675. Asie et Afrique, Mémoires et reconnaissance/inventaire/série 1M tome II. F 141-166, 1832

== Literature ==
- Houda Baïr, « La première carte moderne de Tunis (1831-1832). Le travail de Falbe en contexte », Revue européenne de géographie (2009).
