= Carthage amphitheatre =

Ancient Roman amphitheater in Carthage, Tunisia

UNESCO World Heritage Site
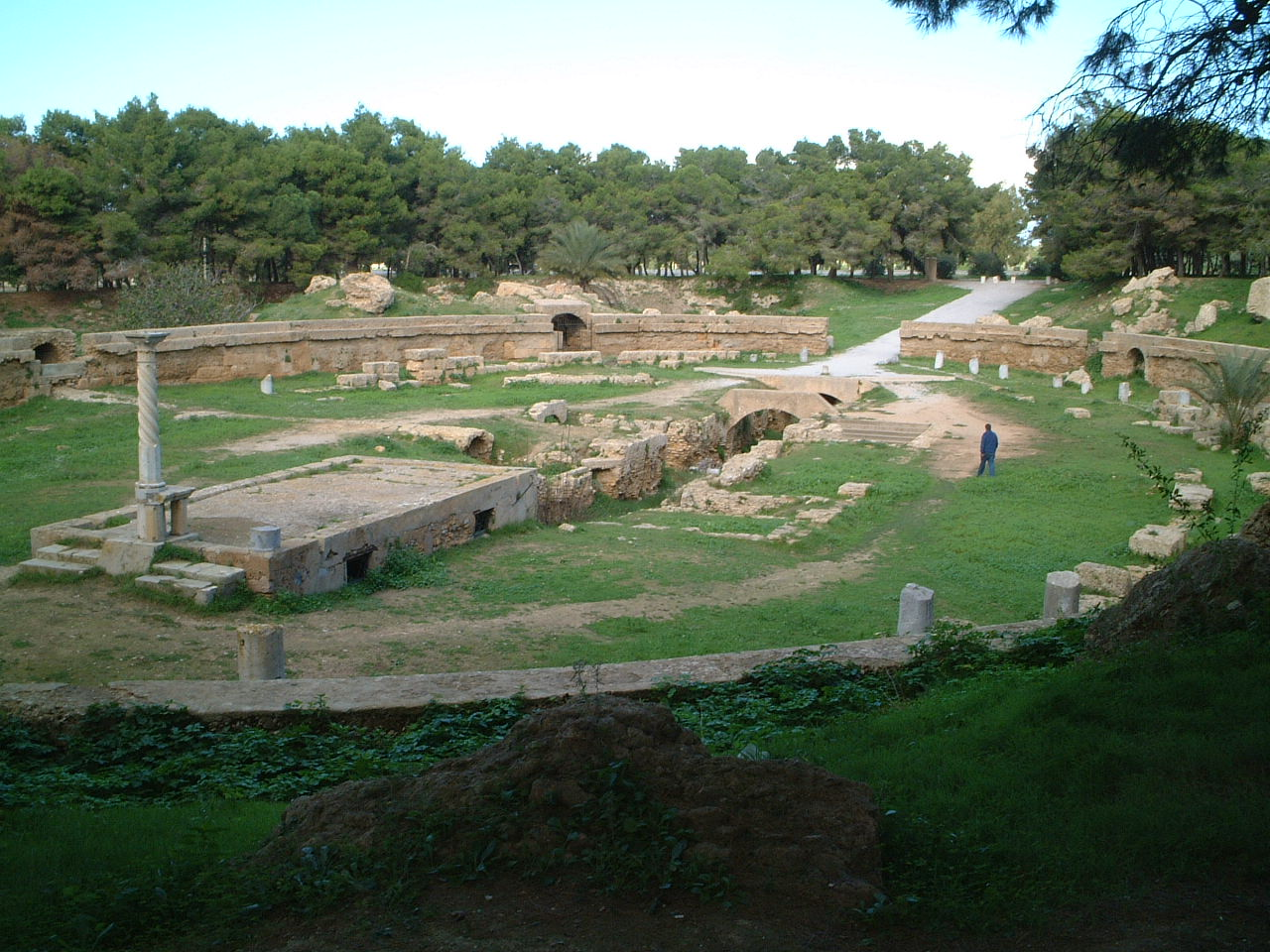
- Amphitheatre of Carthage.
- Interactive map of Carthage amphitheatre
- Location: Carthage, Tunis Governorate, Tunisia
- Part of: "The area of the hills" part of Archaeological Site of Carthage
- Criteria: Cultural: (ii)(iii)(vi)
- Reference: 37-001
- Inscription: 1979 (3rd Session)
- Coordinates: 36°51′22″N 10°18′54.3″E

The Carthage Amphitheatre was a Roman amphitheatre constructed in the first century CE in the city of Carthage, Tunisia, which was rebuilt by Dictator Julius Caesar and became the capital of Africa Proconsularis.

Predation plaguing the archaeological site only exists within the arena itself. The building earned the admiration of travelers, especially during the Middle Ages.

== History ==
The amphitheatre of Carthage was built at the end of the 1st century or the beginning of the 2nd century, to the west of the hill of Byrsa. An inscription date certifies that it was in service from 133–139 C.E. It expanded during the 3rd century.

Al-Bakri gives an account of the amphitheatre in the 11th century, where he describes the monument as "[the] most wonderful Carthage: This building is composed of a circle of arches supported by columns and topped by other things similar to the forefront arcades. On the walls of this building, we see pictures representing animals [...] can be distinguished figures that symbolize the winds: the East looks smiling, and the West has a frowning face".

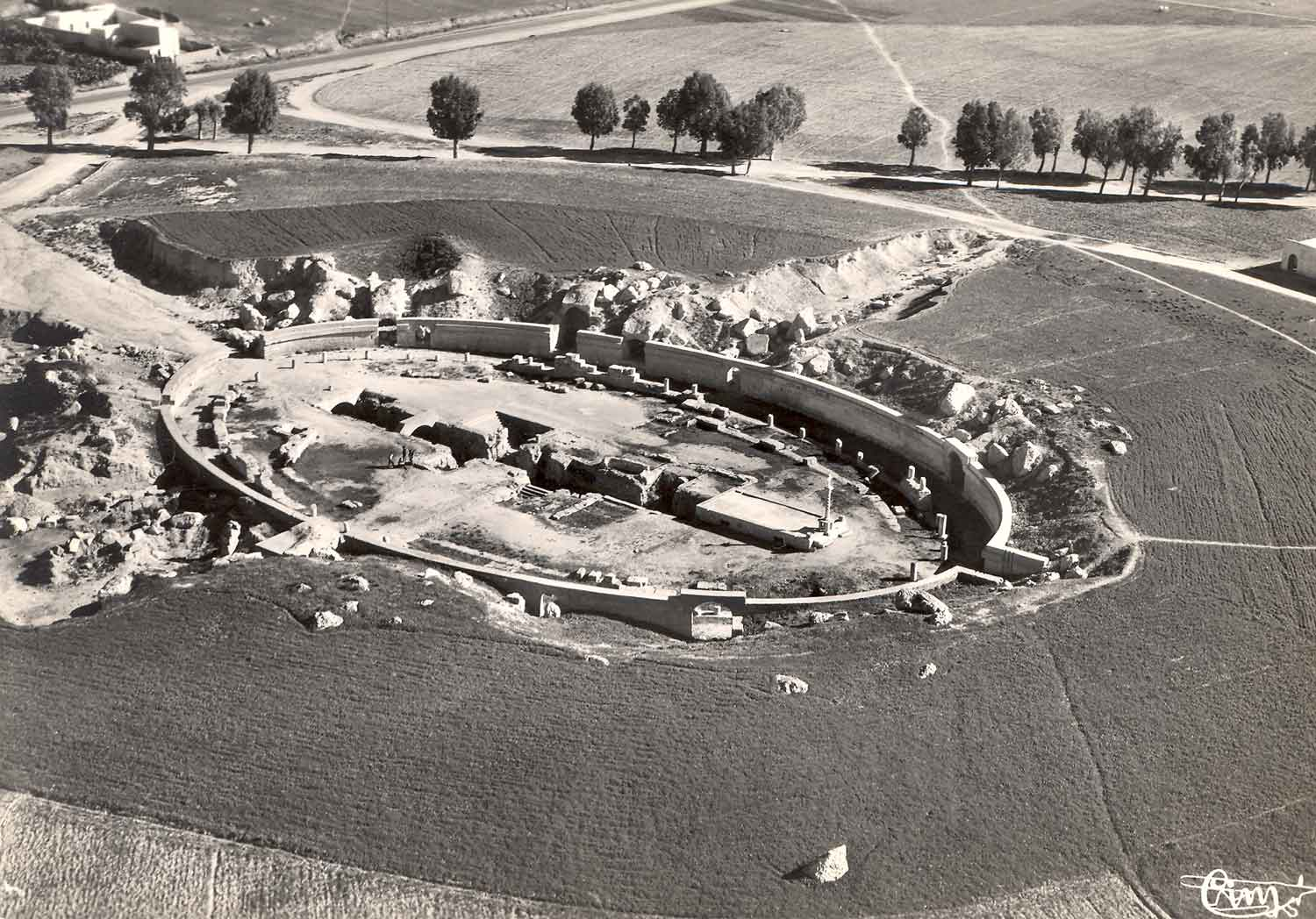
Aerial view (1950)

The height of the arches was the admiration of visitors during the Middle Ages including Al Idrissi, who was impressed by the "circus building consisting of approximately fifty arches"; he adds: "At the top of each arch is an arch, and the arch of the lower arch, we see various figures carved in relief and curious representations of humans, animals, ships, all executed with infinite skill and immense skill".

Since the monument has been raided by looters, the stone and metal have been levelled to the ground. Thus, only the arena remained open at the end of the 19th century and beginning of the 20th century, in the middle of a grove of pine trees. The wall has been restored as well.

In 1887, a cross was erected in the center in memory of the martyrdom of Christians including Perpetua and Felicity. These two saints of the Catholic Church were probably martyred in a similar monument, although we are unsure of which one specifically. The modern construction of a chapel dedicated to the two holy women disrupted basement facilities in the amphitheatre.

== Architectural features ==
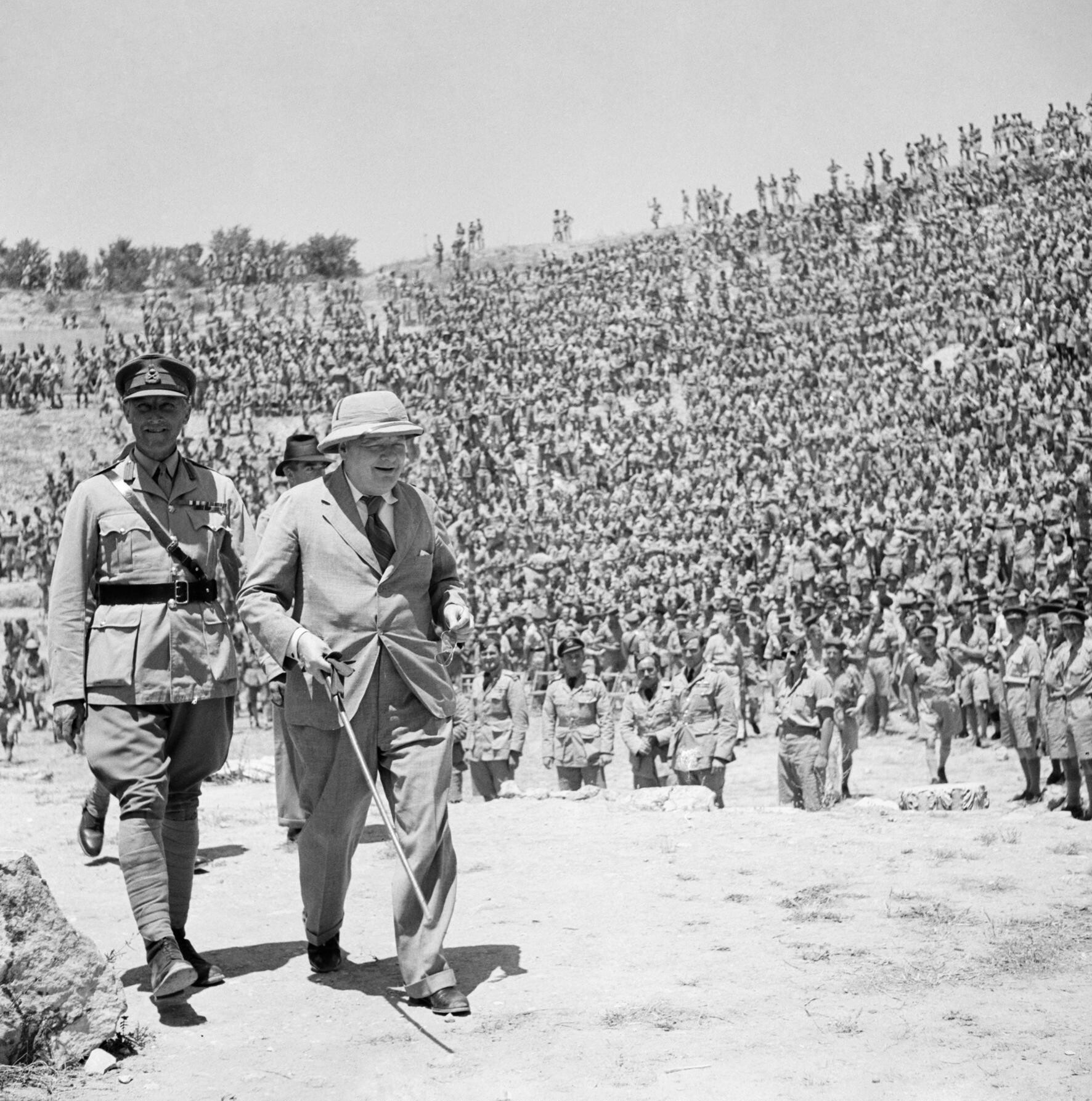
Winston Churchill in the theatre of Carthage, which is not the amphitheatre but is nearby.

The amphitheatre offers an arena 64.66 metres (212.1 ft) on 36.70 metres (120.4 ft), surrounded by a podium built in opus quadratum of 2.5 metres (8 ft 2 in) in height and stands based on a series of 54 spans. Its perimeter is outside of 120 metres (390 ft) on 93 metres (305 ft). During its expansion, its major axis is raised to 156 metres (512 ft) and a width of 128 metres (420 ft), with a front made of blocks Kadhel. Its capacity is estimated at 30,000 seats.

This is one of three African amphitheatres to have been built atop flat ground rather than on a hill, the others being El Jem and Thapsus.

== See also ==
- List of Roman amphitheatres
