= 410th Support Brigade (United States) =

410th Contracting Support Brigade
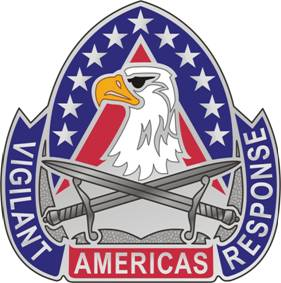
- Distinctive Unit Insignia
- Active: 16 June 2007 - present
- Country: United States
- Branch: US Army
- Type: Support brigade
- Role: Support
- Size: Brigade
- Garrison/HQ: Joint Base San Antonio-Fort Sam Houston, San Antonio Texas
- Motto: Americas Vigilant Respons
- Engagements: Afghanistan; Operation Freedom's Sentinel
- Website: https://www.jbsa.mil/

Commanders
- Current commander: COL Kenneth Ray Bulthuis
- Command Sergeant Major: CSM Deaquennette Thomas

Insignia
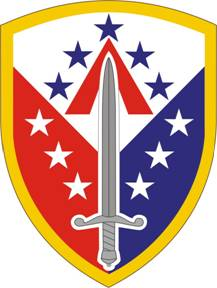
- Former SSI 2007-2010

- Current SSI United States Army Materiel Command

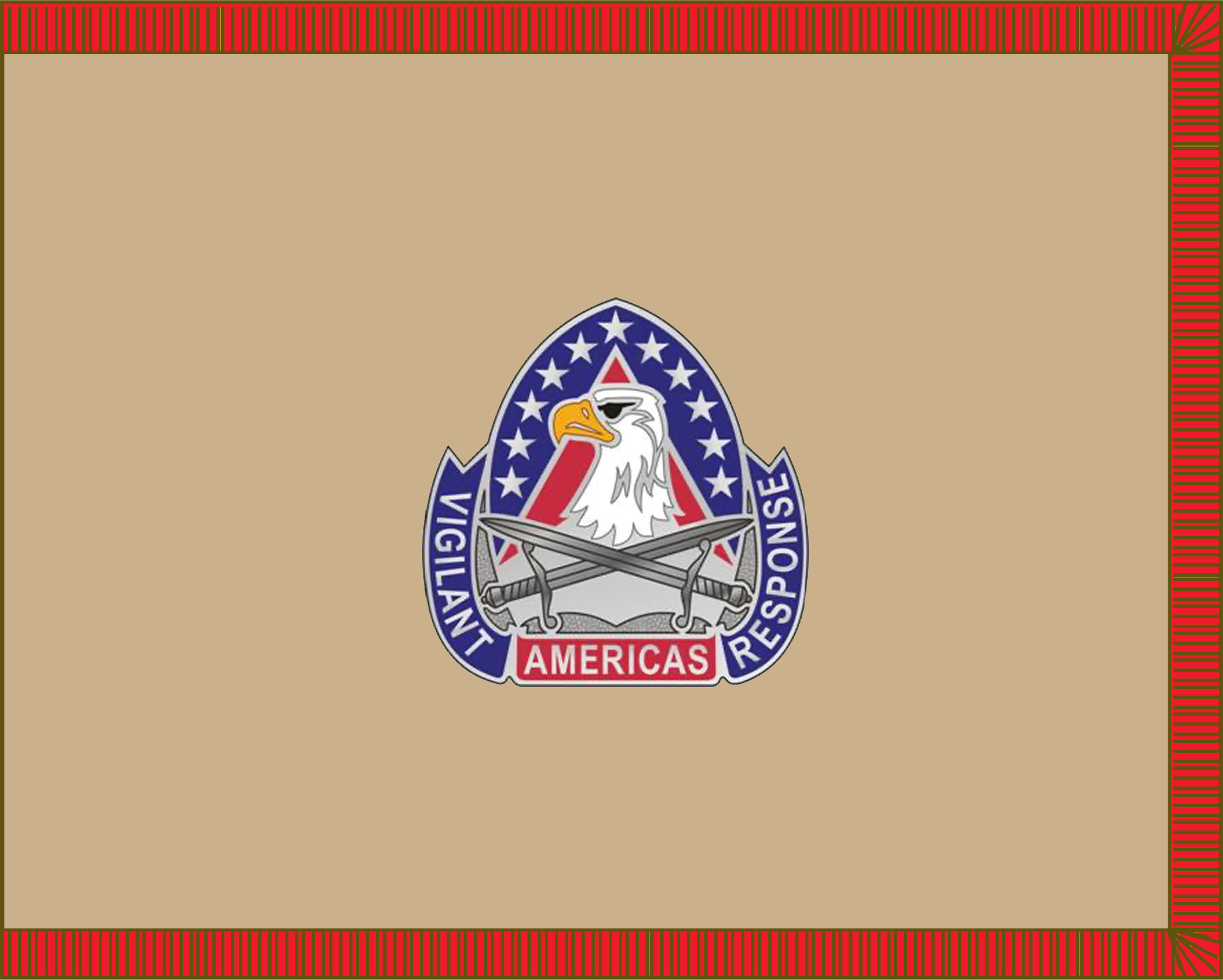
- 410th Contracting Support Brigade Flag

The 410th Contracting Support Brigade is a support brigade of the United States Army. Its mission is to plan and execute contingency contracting support for United States Army South in support of Army and Joint Operations throughout the United States Southern Command area of responsibility. On order provides contingency contracting support worldwide.

The unit received the Army Superior Unit Award in 2023 for its support of Operation Warp Speed.

== Insignia ==
The Distinctive Unit Insignia is a silver metal pin; in the center is an inverted blue shield with a red triangle pointing upward. Above the triangle are 11 silver stars and on the triangle is an eagle's head with two silver swords below it. On a blue and red scroll below is the motto "Americas Vigilant Response."
