= Disability in Italy =

Under Italian Law 104/1992, "disability" is defined as a loss of the ability of the person to perform basic daily activities unaided."

== History ==
Article 3 of The Constitution of the Italian Republic (1948) discusses the equality of Italian citizens. This article states that all Italian citizens are equal by law without discrimination based on sex, race, language, religion, political stance, and personal and social conditions. The Republic is responsible for removing economic or social obstacles that limit the freedom and equality of citizens. These obstacles impede the development of a person and limit effective participation of workers in the economic, political, and social organization of Italy.

Italian law 118/1971 allowed children with disabilities, except for certain cases, to be educated in classrooms with children without disabilities. Law 517/1977 closed schools containing only children with disabilities (called "special schools") in 1977. This law also stated that students with disabilities need to be included in classrooms. Pre-schools and secondary schools administered inclusive education in the 1980s. In 1991, a commission including people with disabilities initiated the Framework Law for the Assistance, Social Inclusion, and the Rights of Persons with Disabilities. This framework led to Law 104/1992 being adopted by the Italian Parliament.

The United Nations introduced the Convention on the Rights of Persons with Disabilities (CRPD) on an international level on December 13, 2006. The CRPD was ratified in Italy by Law 18/2009. Italy agreed to ensure the equal inclusion of people with disabilities in political, economic, social, educational, and cultural contexts by eliminating institutional and environmental barriers and mainstreaming their rights in all legal fields. Based on the United Nations Convention on the Rights of Persons with Disabilities (2006), disability can be defined as a condition of people who have enduring physical, mental, intellectual, or sensory impairments that can hinder full participation in society in equality with others.

== Legislation ==
=== Italian Law 118/1971 ===
This law gives all children, including children with disabilities, the right to be educated in classrooms with children without disabilities. According to national standards, municipalities have the responsibility to make school buildings accessible for all students. This law was amended in 1988; registered disability was defined as those who are affected by inherited or acquired disability, even disabilities of a progressive nature, including mental disability, mental insufficiency, or enduring difficulties to carry out daily tasks and activities. To be eligible for socio-sanitary assistance and an attendance allowance, people with disabilities who are over the age of 65 must have permanent problems carrying out the duties and responsibilities of their age.

=== Italian Law 104/1992 ===
Law 104/1992 guarantees respect for human dignity for people with disabilities, as well as their rights to independence and autonomy, thus facilitating their incorporation into communities, schools, jobs, and society. It aims to prevent and eliminate negative factors that stifle human growth, including the highest possible level of autonomy and social participation. Ensuring appropriate resources, prevention, treatment, and recovery strategies for people with physical and sensory impairments is a necessity to achieve functional and social rehabilitation.

This law aims to remove obstacles (architectural or sensory) and introduces resources to assist people with disabilities in education and training. Technical and didactic equipment should be adjusted to the needs of students with physical or sensory impairments. In addition, schools may form partnerships with centers that specialize in pedagogical consulting, as well as the development or adaptation of specific didactic materials. Classes with students with disabilities normally have a maximum of 20 students, assuming that the inclusion process is implemented by class teachers, support teachers, and school personnel. Support teachers work alongside regular teachers and are involved in all activities, preparation, and evaluation.

=== Ministerial Decree: Law 236/1989 ===
This decree discusses accessibility, visitability, and adaptation in public and private facilities. The Ministerial Decree uses a performative approach that is flexible and adapts to local conditions. The Ministerial Decree discusses the "technical requirements necessary to guarantee the accessibility, adaptability and visitability of private buildings and subsidized and facilitated public residential buildings." Accessibility refers to the ability for people with limited sensory or motor capacity to be able to access buildings and their need to be able to make use of the space and equipment in a safe and autonomous way. Visitability refers to individuals with reduced or limited sensory or motor capacity and ensures access to communal spaces and at least one toilet. Adaptation refers to the possibility that the building space can be adapted at an affordable cost. Facilities should be equipped so that individuals with disabilities can access what is necessary.

=== Decree of the President of the Republic: Law 503/1996 ===
This decree of the president from July 24, 1996, aims to eliminate architectural barriers in buildings, building spaces, and public services. Architectural barriers are defined as a source of discomfort for mobility, including obstacles that limit the safe or comfortable use of space, equipment, or components or the lack of precautions or signals that could endanger anyone and in particular, people with visual or hearing impairments. Articles in this decree include accessibility in building areas, pedestrian spaces, sidewalks, pedestrian crossings, stairs and ramps, public toilets, urban furniture, parking lots, parking of vehicles of people with disabilities, and more such accommodations.

=== Italian Law 68/1999 ===
This law pertains to people with disabilities and job placement. Obligations, sanctions, and incentives for companies to hire people with disabilities were put into place. Companies with more than 15 employees are required to include people with disabilities in their workforce.

== Resources and associations ==
Many organizations and associations exist to inform people with disabilities in Italy about their rights.

=== Associazione Nazionale Famiglie di Disabili Intelletivi e Relazionali (ANFFAS) ===
ANFFAS is a national organization that defends the interests of people with intellectual disabilities and their families in the fields of education, professional training, employment, sport, and leisure.

=== Associazione Sclerosi Tuberosa ===
This association provides information to families and support to the research of tuberous sclerosis. Associazione Sclerosi Tuberosa holds meetings all over Italy to provide awareness about the disorder and the most up-to-date medical treatments.

=== Unione Italiana dei Ciechi ===
Unione Italiana dei Ciechi aims to improve integration for people who are blind or have visual impairments with the community in Italy.

=== Associazione Italiana Persone Down ===
Associazione Italiana Persone Down provides the public with information about Down syndrome. The website focuses specifically on subjects like autonomy, school, rights, work, and health for individuals with Down syndrome.

=== Unione Italiana Lotta alla Distrofia Muscolare (UILDM) ===
This association promotes scientific research on muscular dystrophy and aims to facilitate integration into the community.
