= 410 =

410 in various calendars
- Gregorian calendar: 410; CDX
- Ab urbe condita: 1163
- Assyrian calendar: 5160
- Balinese saka calendar: 331–332
- Bengali calendar: −184 – −183
- Berber calendar: 1360
- Buddhist calendar: 954
- Burmese calendar: −228
- Byzantine calendar: 5918–5919
- Chinese calendar: 己酉年 (Earth Rooster); 3107 or 2900 — to — 庚戌年 (Metal Dog); 3108 or 2901
- Coptic calendar: 126–127
- Discordian calendar: 1576
- Ethiopian calendar: 402–403
- Hebrew calendar: 4170–4171
- Hindu calendars
- Vikram Samvat: 466–467
- Shaka Samvat: 331–332
- Kali Yuga: 3510–3511
- Holocene calendar: 10410
- Iranian calendar: 212 BP – 211 BP
- Islamic calendar: 219 BH – 218 BH
- Javanese calendar: 293–294
- Julian calendar: 410; CDX
- Korean calendar: 2743
- Minguo calendar: 1502 before ROC 民前1502年
- Nanakshahi calendar: −1058
- Seleucid era: 721/722 AG
- Thai solar calendar: 952–953
- Tibetan calendar: ས་མོ་བྱ་ལོ་ (female Earth-Bird); 536 or 155 or −617 — to — ལྕགས་ཕོ་ཁྱི་ལོ་ (male Iron-Dog); 537 or 156 or −616

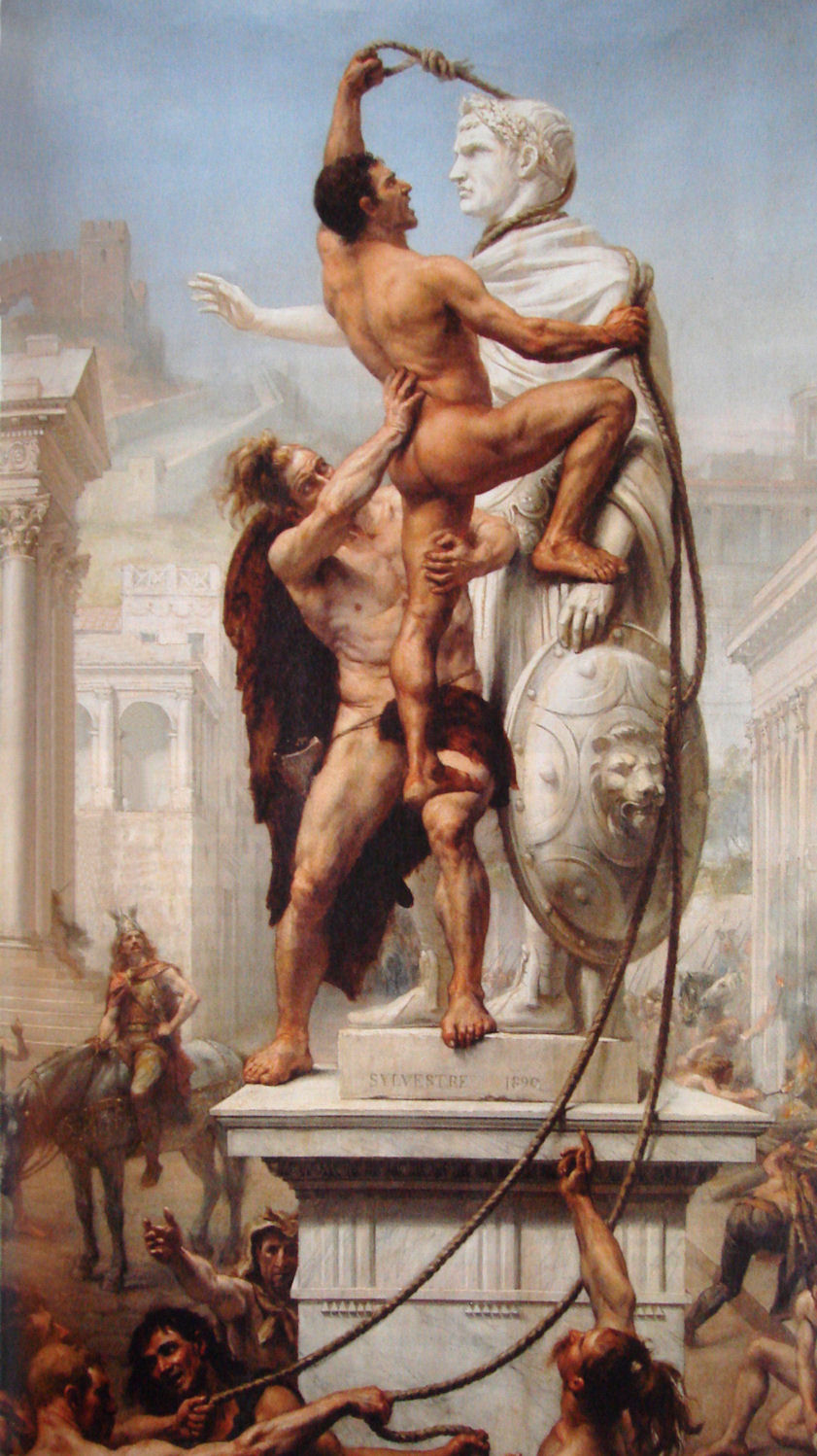
Sack of Rome by the Visigoths

Year 410 (CDX) was a common year starting on Saturday of the Julian calendar. At the time, it was known as the Year after the Consulship of Honorius and Theodosius (or, less frequently, year 1163 Ab urbe condita). The denomination 410 for this year has been used since the early medieval period, when the Anno Domini calendar era became the prevalent method in Europe for naming years.

== Events ==
=== By place ===
==== Roman Empire ====
- Spring – Constantine III crosses the Alps into Liguria (Northern Italy), but retreats to Gaul after Gerontius revolts in Spain against his son Constans II.
- Raiders from Ireland, such as the Uí Liatháin and Laigin, harry the coasts of Wales. They plunder towns and capture slaves but later colonise large areas of what is called Gwynedd, in particular Llŷn, the coasts of Arllechwedd, Arfon and the Isle of Mona (approximate date).
- Flavius Constantius, Roman general and politician, is promoted to the rank of magister militum. He becomes the imperial adviser of Honorius, and the power behind the throne in the Western Roman Empire.
- The Eastern Roman Empire sends six legions (6,000 men) to aid Honorius at Ravenna. He negotiates with King Alaric I, who ceremonially deposes Priscus Attalus as co-emperor.
- August 24 – The Visigoths under Alaric I sack Rome after a third siege. Slaves open the Salarian Gate and Goths loot the city for three days; according to Augustine in The City of God and others, comparatively few Roman men are killed and women raped. Only two churches are burned, and people who took refuge in churches are usually spared. Many Romans who survived the Sack flee to Africa, or to the Eastern Empire (see Saint Jerome). It is the first time since 390 BC that Rome has fallen to an enemy. This marks the decline of the Roman Empire. Only 45 years later, in 455 AD, Rome will again be sacked, this time by the Vandals who will kill, burn, and loot much more ferociously than the Visigoths in 410 AD.
- Galla Placidia, daughter of Theodosius I, is captured by the Visigoths and becomes a hostage during their move from the Italian Peninsula to Gaul.
- Alaric I marches southwards into Calabria and makes plans to invade Africa. But a storm destroys his Gothic fleet and many of his soldiers drown. Alaric dies in Cosenza, probably of fever, and his body is buried along with his treasure under the riverbed of the Busento. He is succeeded by his brother-in-law Ataulf, who becomes king of the Visigoths.
- According to Zosimus, this is the year when Emperor Honorius sends his Rescript (diplomatic letters) to the Romano-British magistrates, ending Roman rule in Great Britain. However this is likely an example of scribal error. Most recently, David Woods has argued that the account refers instead to Raetia, a Roman province north of Italy.

==== Britain ====
- At around this time, one of the first Anglo-Saxon settlements in Britain, Mucking, is established by the mouth of the Thames River. (approximate date)

==== Europe ====
- The city of Aléria on the island of Corsica is devastated by a huge fire, destroying its port and most of its inhabitants.

==== Asia ====
- Prithivisena becomes king of the Vakataka in the Deccan (India).

=== By topic ===
==== Religion ====
- Council of Seleucia: Persian Christians create a national church and adopt the Nicene Creed.
- Honoratus founds the Monastery of Lérins on the île Saint-Honorat (France), and forms a monastic community.

== Births ==
- Pope Gelasius I, Pope in Catholic church (d. 496)
- Severinus of Noricum, monk and saint (approximate date)

== Deaths ==
- Alaric I, king of the Visigoths
- Hanzei, emperor of Japan (approximate date)
- Maron, Syriac Christian monk
- Murong Chao, emperor of Southern Yan (b. 385)
- Yujiulü Shelun, khagan (emperor) of Xianbei
