= 410 BC =

410 BC in various calendars
| Gregorian calendar | 410 BC; CDX BC |
| Ab urbe condita | 344 |
| Ancient Egypt era | XXVII dynasty, 116 |
| Pharaoh | Darius II of Persia, 14 |
| Ancient Greek Olympiad (summer) | 92nd Olympiad, year 3 |
| Assyrian calendar | 4341 |
| Balinese saka calendar | N/A |
| Bengali calendar | −1003 – −1002 |
| Berber calendar | 541 |
| Buddhist calendar | 135 |
| Burmese calendar | −1047 |
| Byzantine calendar | 5099–5100 |
| Chinese calendar | 庚午年 (Metal Horse); 2288 or 2081 — to — 辛未年 (Metal Goat); 2289 or 2082 |
| Coptic calendar | −693 – −692 |
| Discordian calendar | 757 |
| Ethiopian calendar | −417 – −416 |
| Hebrew calendar | 3351–3352 |
- Hindu calendars
| Vikram Samvat | −353 – −352 |
| Shaka Samvat | N/A |
| Kali Yuga | 2691–2692 |
| Holocene calendar | 9591 |
| Iranian calendar | 1031 BP – 1030 BP |
| Islamic calendar | 1063 BH – 1062 BH |
| Javanese calendar | N/A |
| Julian calendar | N/A |
| Korean calendar | 1924 |
| Minguo calendar | 2321 before ROC 民前2321年 |
| Nanakshahi calendar | −1877 |
| Thai solar calendar | 133–134 |
| Tibetan calendar | 阳金马年 (male Iron-Horse) −283 or −664 or −1436 — to — 阴金羊年 (female Iron-Goat) −282 or −663 or −1435 |

Year 410 BC was a year of the pre-Julian Roman calendar. At the time, it was known as the Year of the Consulship of Mamercinus and Volusus (or, less frequently, year 344 Ab urbe condita). The denomination 410 BC for this year has been used since the early medieval period, when the Anno Domini calendar era became the prevalent method in Europe for naming years.

== Events ==
=== By place ===
==== Greece ====
- Commanding 20 ships, the Athenian generals Theramenes and Thrasybulus collaborate with Alcibiades and the main Athenian fleet in inflicting a major defeat on the Spartan navy commanded by Mindarus and its supporting Persian land army near Cyzicus on the shore of the Propontis (Sea of Marmara). As a result of its victory in the Battle of Cyzicus, Athens regains control over the vital grain route from the Black Sea.
- Alcibiades installs a garrison at Chrysopolis under Theramenes to exact a tithe from all shipping that comes from the Black Sea. This revenue enables the Athenians to put an end to the regime of the Five Thousand and restore their traditional institutions in full. Democracy is restored in Athens. The new demagogue Cleophon dismisses peace overtures made by Sparta.
- An Oligarchic revolt in Corcyra is unsuccessful.

==== Cyprus ====
- Evagoras re-establishes his family's claim as kings of Salamis which has been under Phoenician control for a number of years.

=== By subject ===
==== Art ====
- A relief decoration from the parapet (now destroyed), Nike (Victory) adjusting her sandal is constructed in the Temple of Athena Nike on the Acropolis in Athens and is ready in 407 BC. It is now preserved at the Acropolis Museum in Athens.
- The grave stele of Hegeso is made and is finished about ten years later (approximate date). It is now preserved at the National Archaeological Museum in Athens.

== Deaths ==
- Hippocrates of Chios, Greek mathematician and astronomer (approximate date)
