= Hundred and Four =

Carthaginian tribunal

The Hundred and Four, or Council of 104 (Phoenician miat, from mia "hundred", Ancient Greek: Εκατόν, Latin: Ordo judicum), was a Carthaginian tribunal of judges. They were created early in Carthage's history, and are described in Aristotle's Politics (4th century BC) as "the highest constitutional authority." The Hundred and Four were in charge of judging generals and the military, who exercised a great deal of independence from the government in Carthage. The Hundred and Four were intended to provide a check to ensure the military served the needs of the senate and the people. However, by the time of Hannibal, and his stint as Suffet (early 2nd century BC), the 104 had acquired tyrannical power.

“By the old constitution, the Senate had the right to control the magistrates; but this new body of judges controlled the Senate, and therefore, in reality, the magistrates also. Nor was it content to control the Senate; it practically superseded it... No Shofete, no Senator, no general, was exempt from their irresponsible despotism. The Shofetes presided, the senators deliberated, the generals fought, as it were, with a halter around their necks. The sentences passed by the Hundred, if they were often deserved, were often also, like those of the dreaded “Ten” at Venice, to whom they bore a striking resemblance, arbitrary and cruel.”

By leading a populist reform movement—including substituting annual rotation in office for the life tenure formerly enjoyed by the 104—Hannibal managed to restore a measure of popular rule. Until Hannibal's reforms the Hundred and Four held their position for life. During Hannibal's term as Suffett he used popular support to change the term to a year and to add a term limit of two years.
