= Giovanni Anastasi (merchant) =

Swedish-Norwegian Consul General

Giovanni d'Anastasi, Jean d'Anastasy
- Ιωάννης Αναστασίου
- Born: ca. 1780; Thessaloniki
- Died: 1860; Alexandria
- Occupations: merchant; Consul General of Sweden and Norway in Egypt
- Known for: collections of Egyptian antiquities in Leiden, London, and Paris

Giovanni d'Anastasi (Thessaloniki, ca. 1780 – Alexandria, 1860), also known as Giovanni Anastasi, Jean d'Anastasy, Ιωάννης or Γιάννης Αναστασίου (and variants), was a Greek merchant based in Alexandria (Egypt), active in the Mediterranean and beyond. From 1828 through 1857 he served as Consul General of the United Kingdoms of Sweden and Norway in Egypt. He is mainly known for the collections of Egyptian antiquities he sold to national museums of the Netherlands, France, and the United Kingdom.

== Life and work ==
Anastasi was the son of a Greek merchant from Damascus. His father made his fortune as a supplier of the French army in Egypt, then lost it when the French were defeated and forced to leave the country. During Muhammad Ali's early rule Anastasi established his merchant house in Alexandria and rebuilt the family business. He acquired the monopoly on trading grain produced in Muhammad Ali's dominion; Sweden, trading for iron, was a major buyer. Sweden and Norway appointed Anastasi their Consul General in Egypt, and Knight in the Order of Vasa, in 1828.

Anastasi's merchant house had branches (staffed by family members or representatives) in important Mediterranean ports, among which Alexandria, Livorno, Smyrna, Thessaloniki, and Malta. In Alexandria Anastasi was among the select Greek merchant families that dominated international trade as well as the Egyptian economy, the others being Casulli, Tossizza (or Tositsas) and Zizinia.

Anastasi acquired great riches and prestige, and was known as a benefactor. His duties as Swedish consul included serving the interests of Swedish nationals in Egypt, but according to his contemporaries he was generous in offering lodgings and practical support to travellers of all nationalities. Closely involved with Muhammad Ali's urban modernisations in Alexandria, he built an okelle (semi-public building serving as city mansion, warehouse, and guest house) on the Place des Consuls. He reportedly spent great sums of money helping to finance the Greek War of Independence and liberating Greek prisoners of war. In Alexandria he co-financed the establishment of a Greek Orthodox hospital, school, and church building.

=== Egyptian antiquities ===
An influential diplomat and merchant in Egypt, Anastasi ran a lucrative side business in Egyptian antiquities. He put together collections of high-quality objects, a process lasting several years, for sale to large-scale buyers in Western Europe. It is uncertain whether he himself organised excavations (as Henry Salt, Giovanni Belzoni, Bernardino Drovetti and others did); he did cooperate with or instructed Giovanni Piccinini (an Italian, in Thebes and Abydos), French-American Francis Barthow, and Austrian consul Giuseppe di Nizzoli (in Saqqara).

In 1826 Anastasi's first collection of antiquities was shipped to Livorno and stored in the warehouse of his agent Costantino Tossizza, where the objects could be viewed by prospective buyers or their representatives. Jean Emile Humbert, in Livorno on the orders of Caspar Reuvens, acquired the collection for the Rijksmuseum van Oudheden in Leiden, the Netherlands, in 1827.

Anastasi's second collection of antiquities was shipped in 1838, first to Livorno, then to London. The British Museum acquired a large number of objects at the auction of the collection in London. The third collection was auctioned in Paris in 1857; the Louvre, the British Museum, as well as private collectors acquired pieces.

In 1830 Anastasi was appointed corresponding member of the Royal Swedish Academy of Sciences. He was an associate member of the Egyptian Society (Cairo, founded 1836) and an honorary member of the Institut Égyptien (Alexandria, founded 1859). Membership of these scientific societies was usually reserved for West-European members.

Anastasi had friendly relations with Egyptologists, among whom Jean-François Champollion and Karl Lepsius, offering them practical support and acting as a host during their expeditions in Egypt.

=== Family life ===
As far as known, Anastasi remained unmarried and did not father any offspring. He adopted two girls who were left orphaned by the Missolonghi bloodbath in 1826. One daughter, named Marie or Mariethe, married Vincent Benedetti, Consul General of France; the other daughter married a French engineer or a Greek banker who later settled in Vienna. He also provided dowries for other female family members, enabling them to marry diplomats or merchants in his network. When Anastasi's brother in law Nikolaos Papafis died, he took the latter's son Ioannis Papafis under his wing.

Anastasi was buried in the first Greek-Orthodox cemetery of Alexandria; his tomb is in the shape of a square kiosk, inscribed "D'Anastasy", supported by four Doric columns, over an urn on a truncated column. The Okelle Anastasi in Alexandria was destroyed in the Bombardment of Alexandria in 1882.

== Name ==
The variants of Anastasi's name given by different writers are due to the various languages spoken in his network at the time. His first name (in Greek: fully Ιωάννης, abbreviated Γιάννης) can be given as Giannis (Italian-Greek), Giovanni or Gianni (Italian), Jean (French); the English equivalent is John. His family name Αναστασίου or Ανάσταση is given as (d')Anastasi or (d')Anastasy; the prefix de can also be interpreted as honorific (comte d'Anastasy because of his knighthood).

== Collections of antiquities ==
- 1826: donation to Sweden; objects now in the Medelhavsmuseet, Stockholm, a.o.
  - sarcophagus of Taperet
- 1828, collection Anastasi I (5,889 pieces): sold to the Rijksmuseum van Oudheden, Leiden, a.o.
  - statues and double statue of Maya and his wife Meryt
  - Ipuwer Papyrus
  - part of the demotic Magical Papyrus London-Leiden
  - Leyden papyrus X
- 1839, collection Anastasi II (1,326 pieces): sold to the British Museum, London, a.o.
  - ostracon containing a fragment of the Story of Sinuhe
  - Papyrus Anastasi I-VI
  - part of the demotic Magical Papyrus London-Leiden
  - double statue of Horemheb and his wife Amenia
- 1857, collection Anastasi III (1,199 pieces): auctioned in Paris, a large number bought by the Louvre, o.a.
  - stelae
  - magical, funerary, and documentary papyri
  - rings and other jewellery
- two sphinxes of Amenhotep III on the bank of the Neva in Saint Petersburg

=== Gallery ===
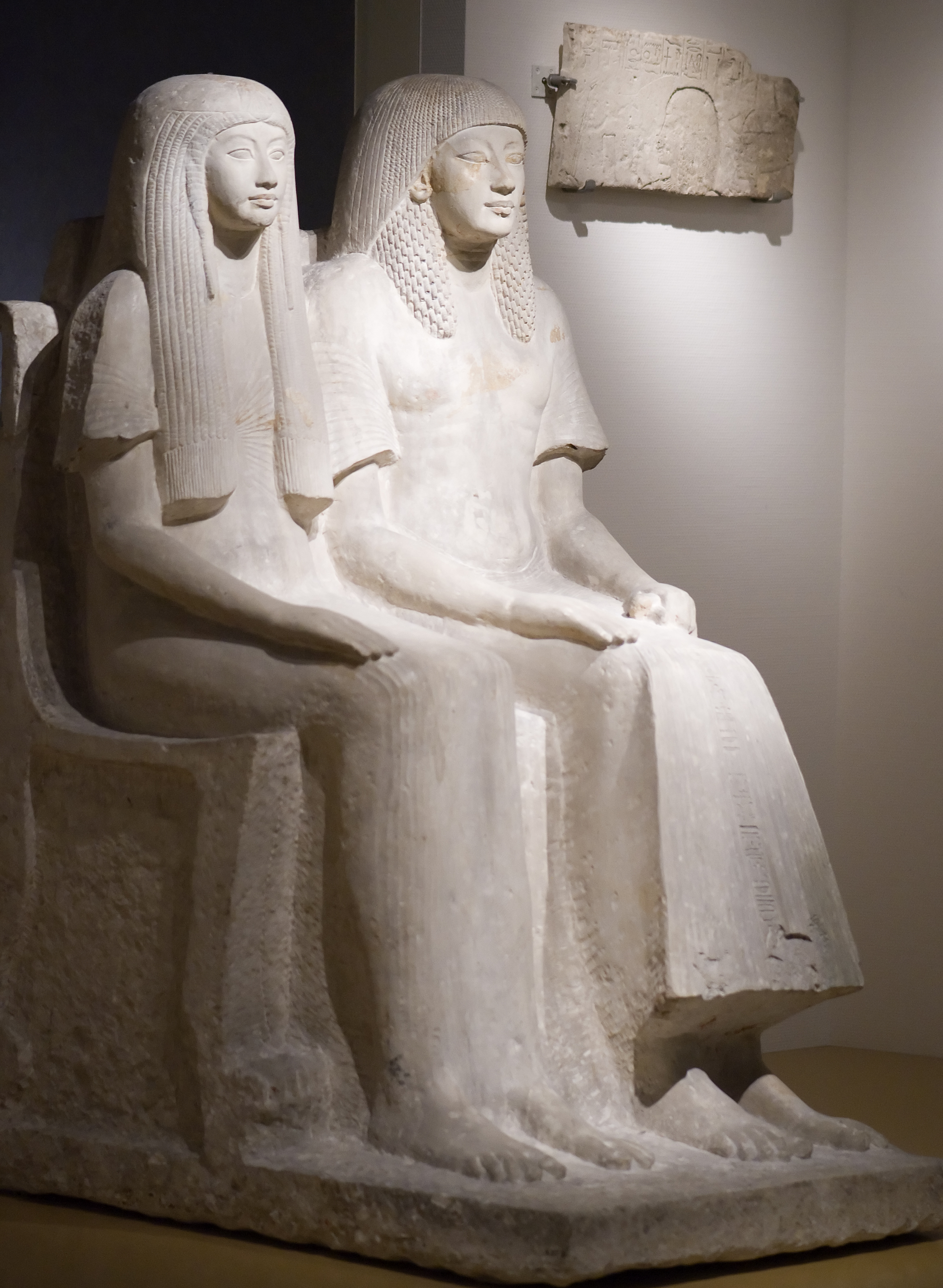
Double statue of Maya and Meryt.
Rijksmuseum van Oudheden, Leiden.

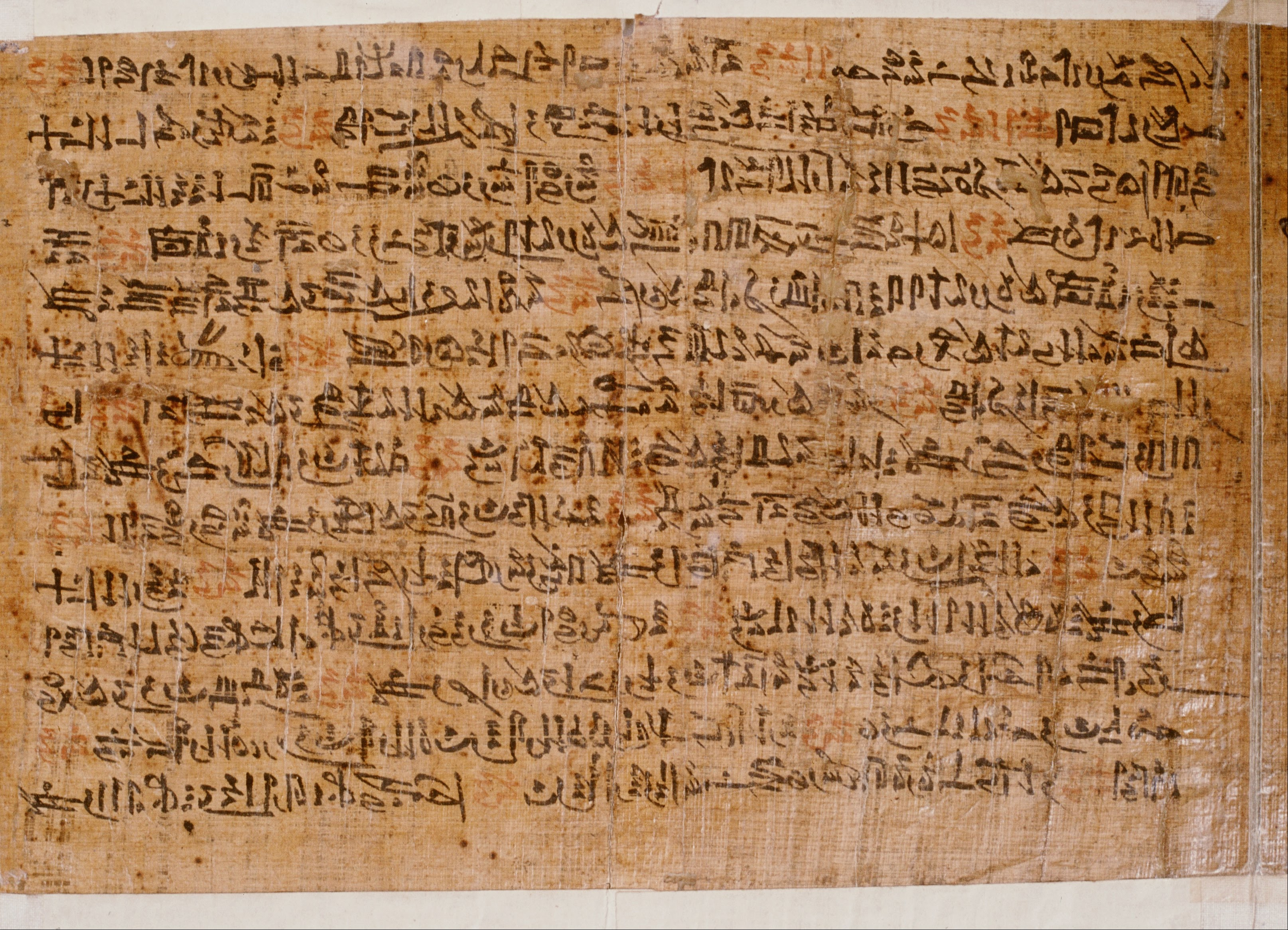
Papyrus Leiden I 344 containing the Admonitions of Ipuwer.
Rijksmuseum van Oudheden, Leiden.

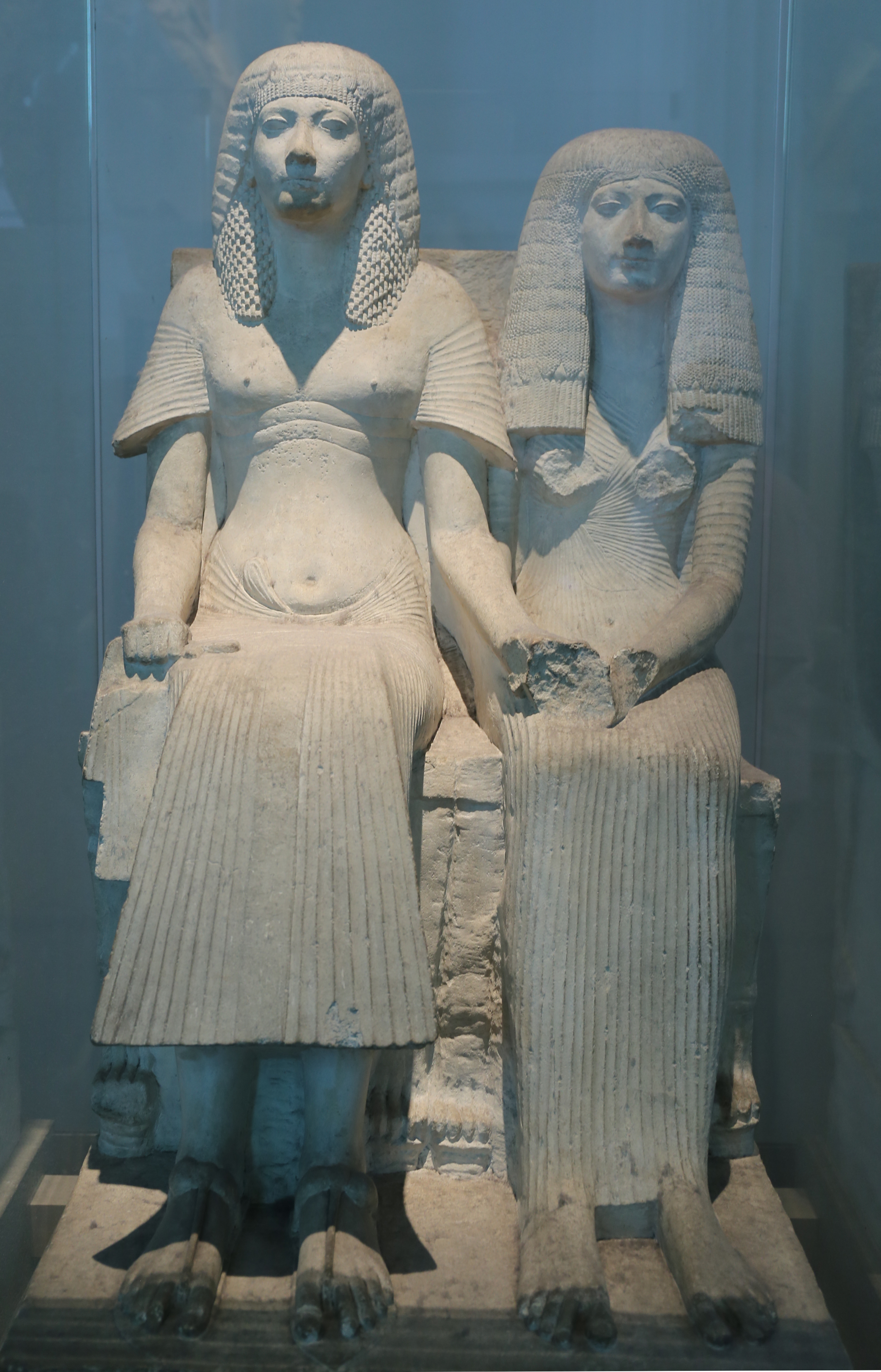
Double statue of Horemheb and his first wife Amenia.
British Museum, London.

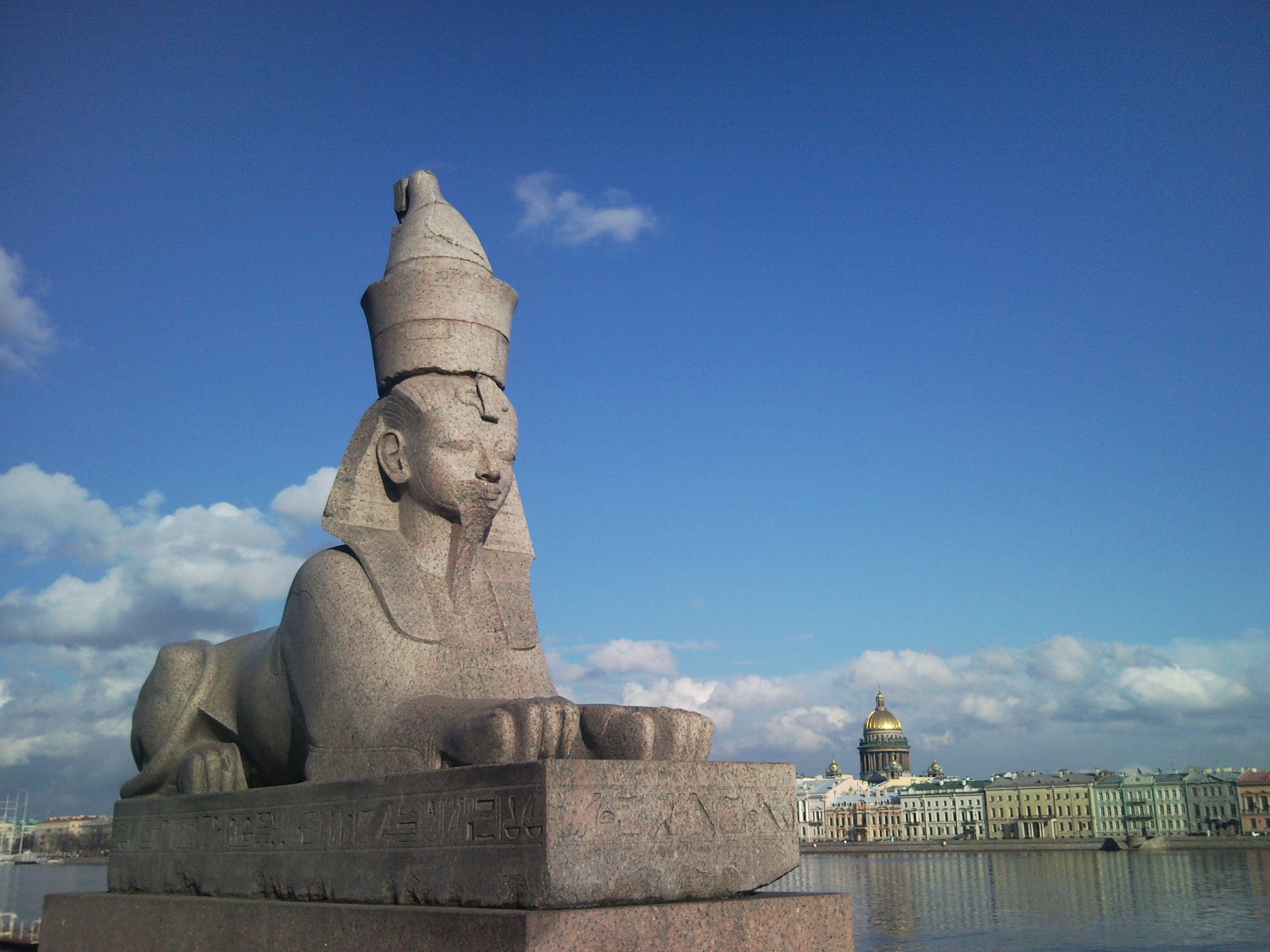
Sphinx of Amenhotep III.
Saint Petersburg.

== See also ==
- Giovanni di Niccolò Pappaffy (1792–1886), Anastasi's nephew, merchant in British Malta, Greek national benefactor
- Giuseppe Passalacqua (1797–1865), Italian antiquities merchant, first director of the Egyptian Museum of Berlin
- Henry Salt (1780–1827), antiquities merchant, British Consul General in Egypt
- Giovanni Belzoni (1778–1823), Italian explorer, antiquities merchant
- Egyptian Greeks, the ethnic Greek community in Egypt

== Bibliography ==
- Bierbrier, Morris L. (2019). "ANASTASI, Giovanni (1700-1860)". Who was who in Egyptology (5 ed.). Londen: Egypt Exploration Society. p. 16. ISBN 978-0856982484.
- Chrysikopoulos, Vasileios I. (2015). "À l'aube de l'égyptologie hellénique et de la constitution des collections égyptiennes: des nouvelles découvertes sur Giovanni d'Anastasi et Tassos Neroutsos". In Kousoulis, P.; Lazaridis, N. (eds.). Proceedings of the Tenth International Congress of Egyptologists, University of the Aegean, Rhodes, 22-29 May 2008. Orientalia Lovaniensia Analecta (in French). Vol. 241. Leuven: Peeters. pp. 2147–2162.
- Dawson, W.R. (1949). "Anastasi, Sallier and Harris and their Papyri". Journal of Egyptian Archaeology. 35: 158–166. doi:10.2307/3855225. JSTOR 3855225.
- Enmarch, Roland (April 1, 2006). "New work on old texts". Egyptian Archaeology: Bulletin of the Egypt Exploration Society. 28. Egypt Exploration Society: 36–37.
- Fowden, Garth (1993). The Egyptian Hermes. A historical approach to the late pagan mind. Princeton University Press. p. 168. ISBN 978-0-691-02498-1.
- Griffith, F. Ll.; Thompson, Herbert (1904). The Demotic Magical Papyrus of London and Leiden (PDF). London: H. Grevel & Co.
- Lenormant, François (1857). Catalogue d'une collection d'antiquités égyptiennes. Cette collection, rassemblée par M. d'Anastasi consul général de Suede à Alexandrie sera vendue aux enchères publiques rue de Clichy № 76, les mardi 23, mercredi 24, jeudi 25, vendredi 26 & samedi 27 juin 1857, à une heure (in French). Paris: Maulde & Renou.
- Parkinson, R. B. (2009). Among other histories. Reading Ancient Egyptian poetry from 1850 BC to the present. Wiley-Blackwell. p. 226. ISBN 978-1-4051-2547-5.
- Raven, Maarten J. (2018). "Hoe beslissend een aankoop kan zijn. Mysterieuze verzamelaar Giovanni d'Anastasi bezorgde Leiden wereldfaam met zijn Egyptische collectie". In Ter Keurs, Pieter; Wirtz, Willem (eds.). Rijksmuseum van Oudheden Leiden. Een geschiedenis van 200 jaar (in Dutch). Zwolle: Waanders. pp. 72–78. ISBN 978-9462621756.
- Verschoor, Vincent (2018). "Het eigenbelang van een gedreven kosmopoliet. Koopman, diplomaat en oudhedenverzamelaar Giovanni d'Anastasi was invloedrijk in en buiten Europa". In Ter Keurs, Pieter; Wirtz, Willem (eds.). Rijksmuseum van Oudheden Leiden. Een geschiedenis van 200 jaar (in Dutch). Zwolle: Waanders. pp. 79–85. ISBN 978-9462621756.
