= Rottiers =

Rottiers is a surname. Notable people with the surname include:

- Édouard Rottiers (1898–?), Belgian sport wrestler
- Karel Rottiers (1953–2024), Belgian cyclist
- Vincent Rottiers (born 1986), French actor

== See also ==
- Rottiers Collection, former art collections
- Rottier (surname)
