= Rottner =

Rottner is a surname. Notable people with the surname include:

- Jean Rottner (born 1967), French politician
- Mickey Rottner (1919–2011), American basketball player

== See also ==
- Rotner
- Rottier (surname)
