= Conradus Leemans =

Dutch archaeologist

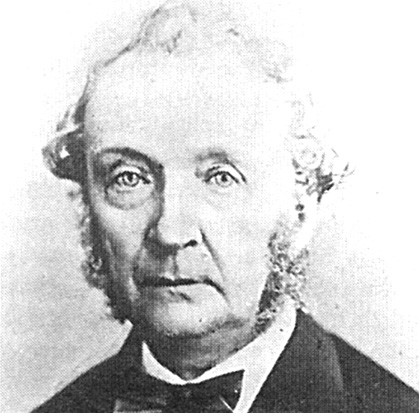
Conradus Leemans

Conradus Leemans (24 April 1809 – 14 October 1893) was a Dutch Egyptologist.

== Early life ==
Conradus Leemans was born in 1809 in Zalt-Bommel, Netherlands, and was the eldest son of physician Dr. Willem Leemans and Hillegonda Rachel Ganderheijden. His parents moved to Leiden, Netherlands, in 1821.

== Education ==
Leemans enrolled at Leiden University in 1826 to study theology, but changed to archaeology in 1828 apparently after meeting with Caspar Reuvens.

== Leiden Museum ==
In 1834 he was employed at the Leiden Museum and while there became successor to Reuvens as Director, during 1839. He continued in this capacity until sometime during 1891. Leemans organised the first public display of collections of acquisitions made by Reuvens, compiled a catalogue of Egyptian objects (Catalogue raisonnée, 1840), and edited the serial publication of the Monumens égyptiens, this being a lithographic account detailing the collection.

Leemans studied the Leiden papyrus while Director of the museum, completing the work begun by Reuvens on this. But while executing the task, Leemans at some time added to the papyri a form of vegetable paper, which was added by him in order to preserve the artifact. Either the paper or glue used to affix the paper has degraded causing some of the writing to become obscured, and Leemans's addition is thought to be fixed permanently, since otherwise too great damage would be done to the artifact in its removal.

Leemans became member of the Royal Institute, predecessor to the Royal Netherlands Academy of Arts and Sciences, in 1840. He was elected as a member to the American Philosophical Society in 1886.
