= Temple of Ellesyia =

Ancient Egyptian temple now in Italy

- The temple on display at the Museo Egizio.
- Interactive map of Temple of Ellesyia
- 22.622568°N 31.962662°E
- Location: Museo Egizio, Turin, Italy

The Temple of Ellesyia is an ancient Egyptian rock-cut temple originally located near the site of Qasr Ibrim and today on display at the Museo Egizio in Turin, Italy. It was built during the 18th Dynasty by the Pharaoh Thutmosis III. The temple was dedicated to the deities Amun, Horus and Satis.

Entrance to the temple, vestibule

Interior of the temple

Tuthmosis III (1479–1425 BCE) had a small temple carved into the rock at Ellesiya, not far from Abu Simbel, dedicated to Horus of Miam and Satet. The temple was only accessible from the river. The interior features an inverted T-shaped structure, consisting of a corridor and two side chambers. On the walls, scenes depict offerings made by the king to the Egyptian and Nubian gods. The figures face the back wall, where statues of Horus, Satet, and Tuthmosis III on a throne are carved in half-relief.

During Akhenaten's reign (1352–1336), the decorations were chiseled at various points. Rameses II (1279–1213) later restored it, remodeling the triad in the rear niche with Amon, Horus, and the king. Eventually, it became a Christian place of worship, evident from crosses and five-pointed stars engraved on the entrance portal and interior walls.

== Move to Turin ==
Being within the area slated to be submerged by Lake Nasser after the construction of the Aswan High Dam, the temple of Ellesiya was part of UNESCO's International Campaign to Save the Monuments of Nubia. The temple was dismantled and moved to the Museo Egizio in Turin in 1967.

== Gallery ==
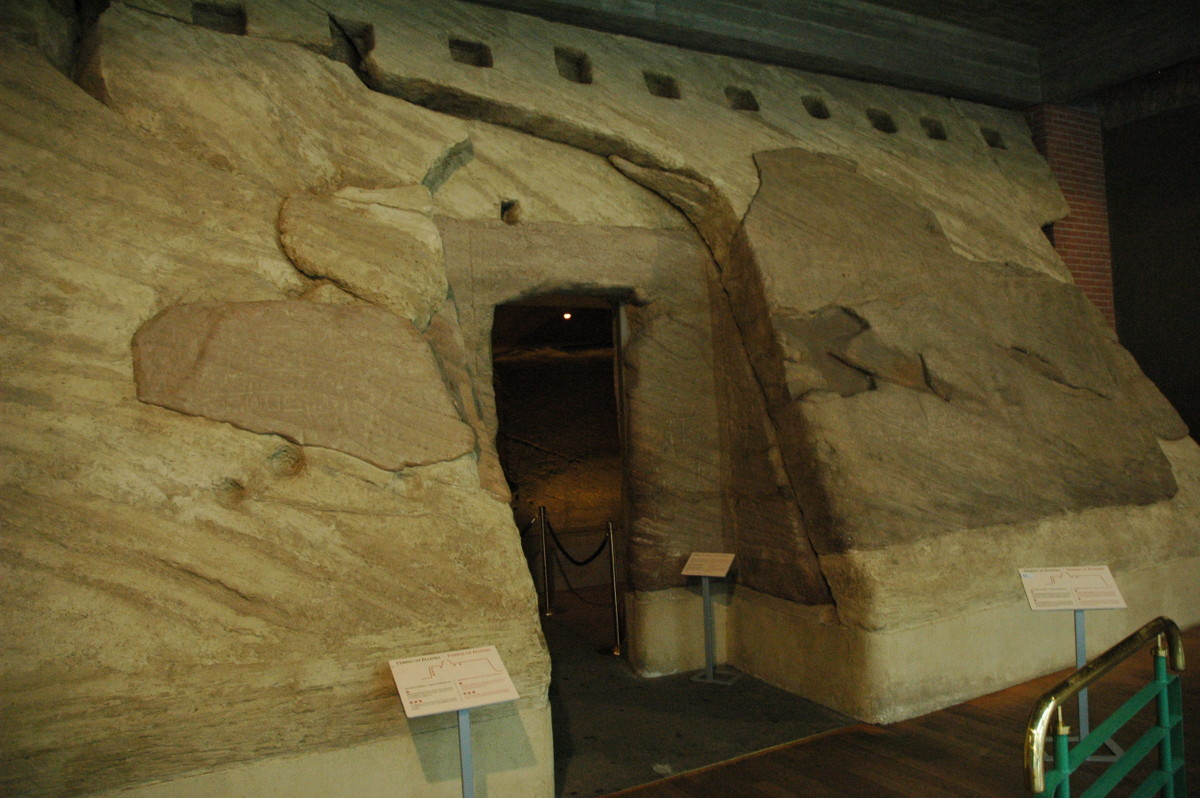

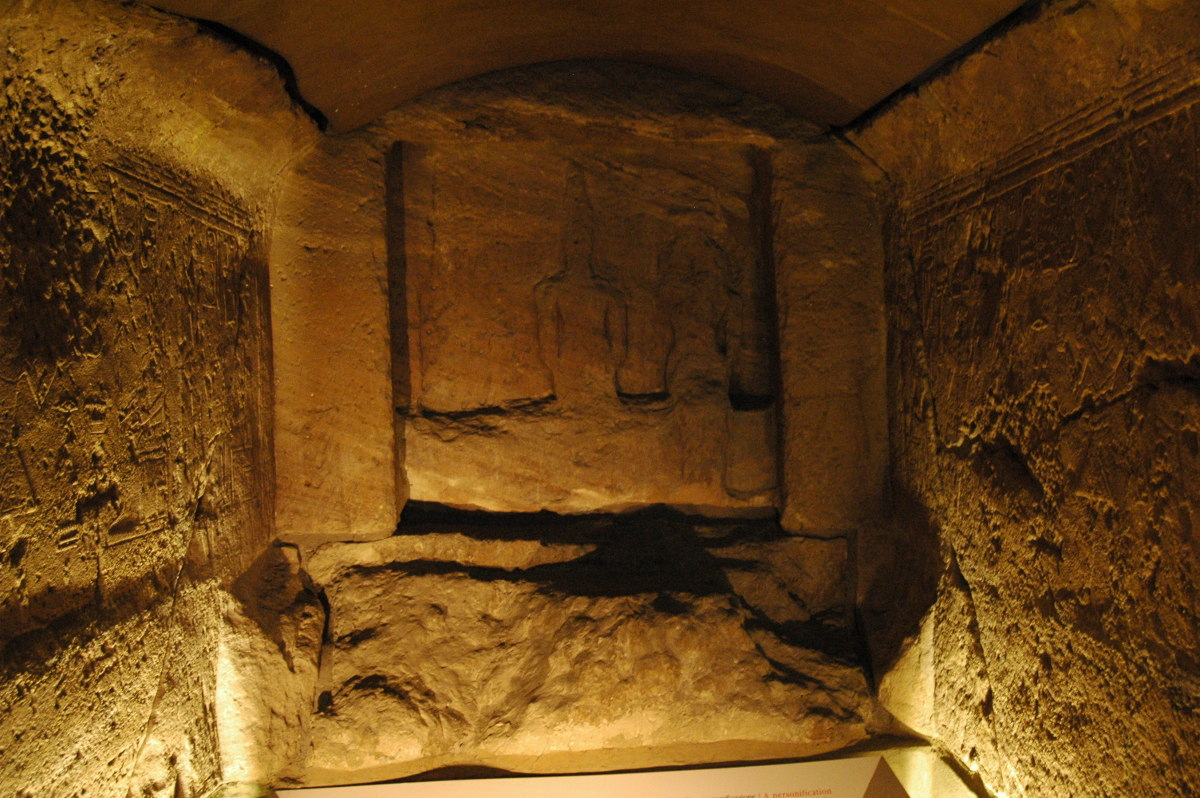

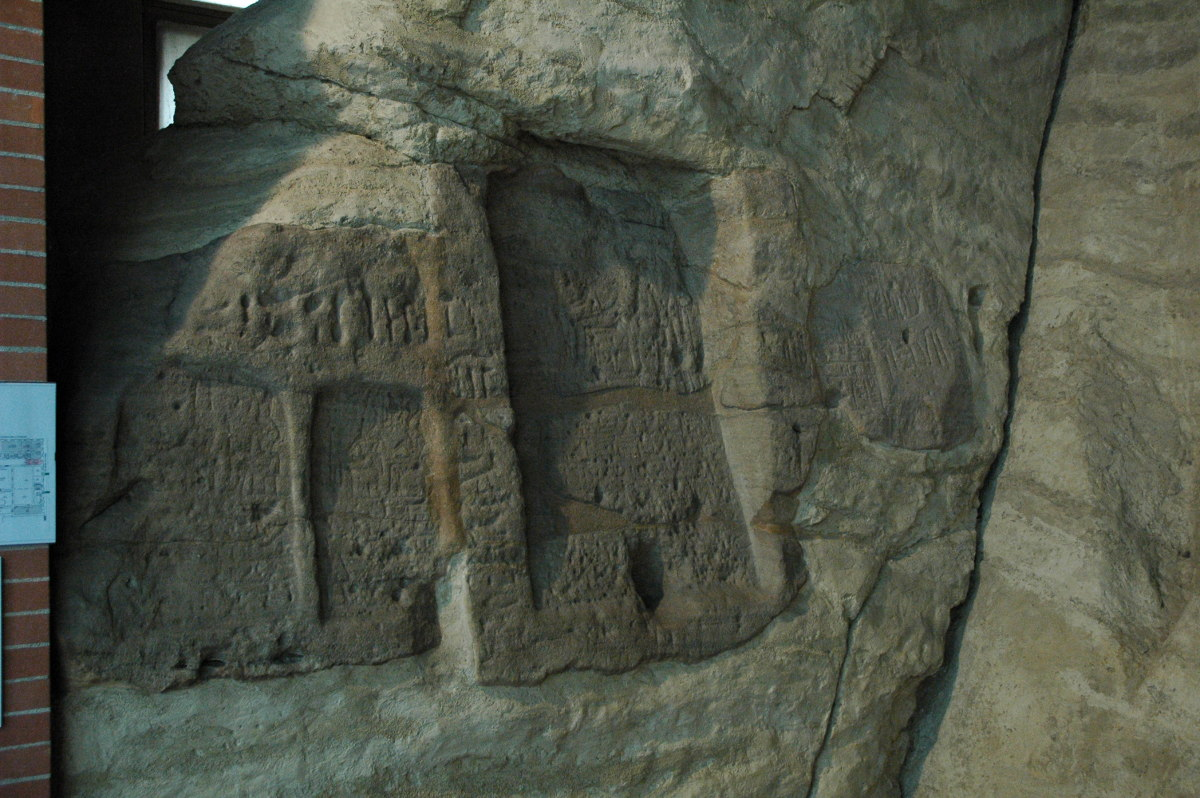

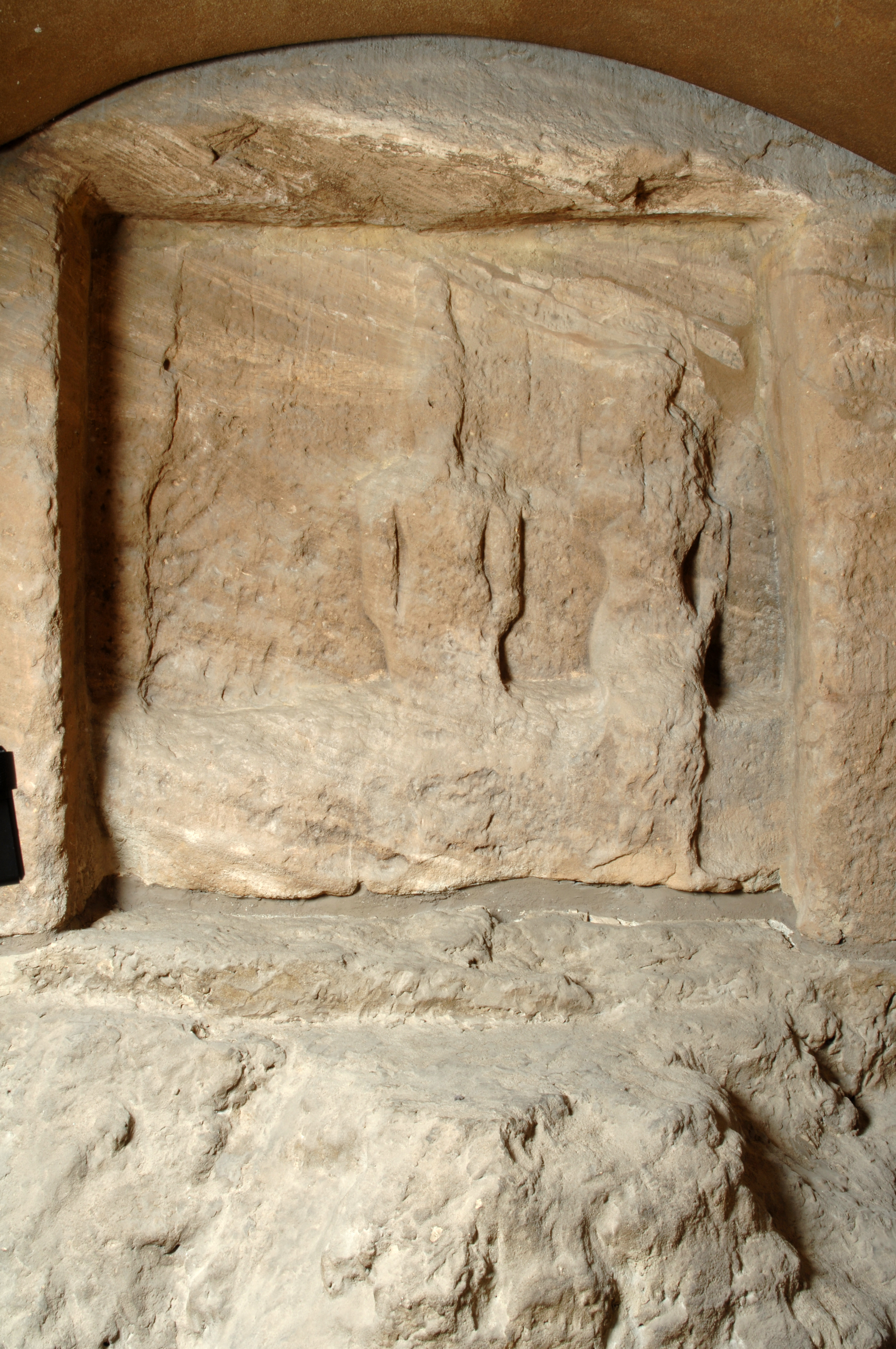

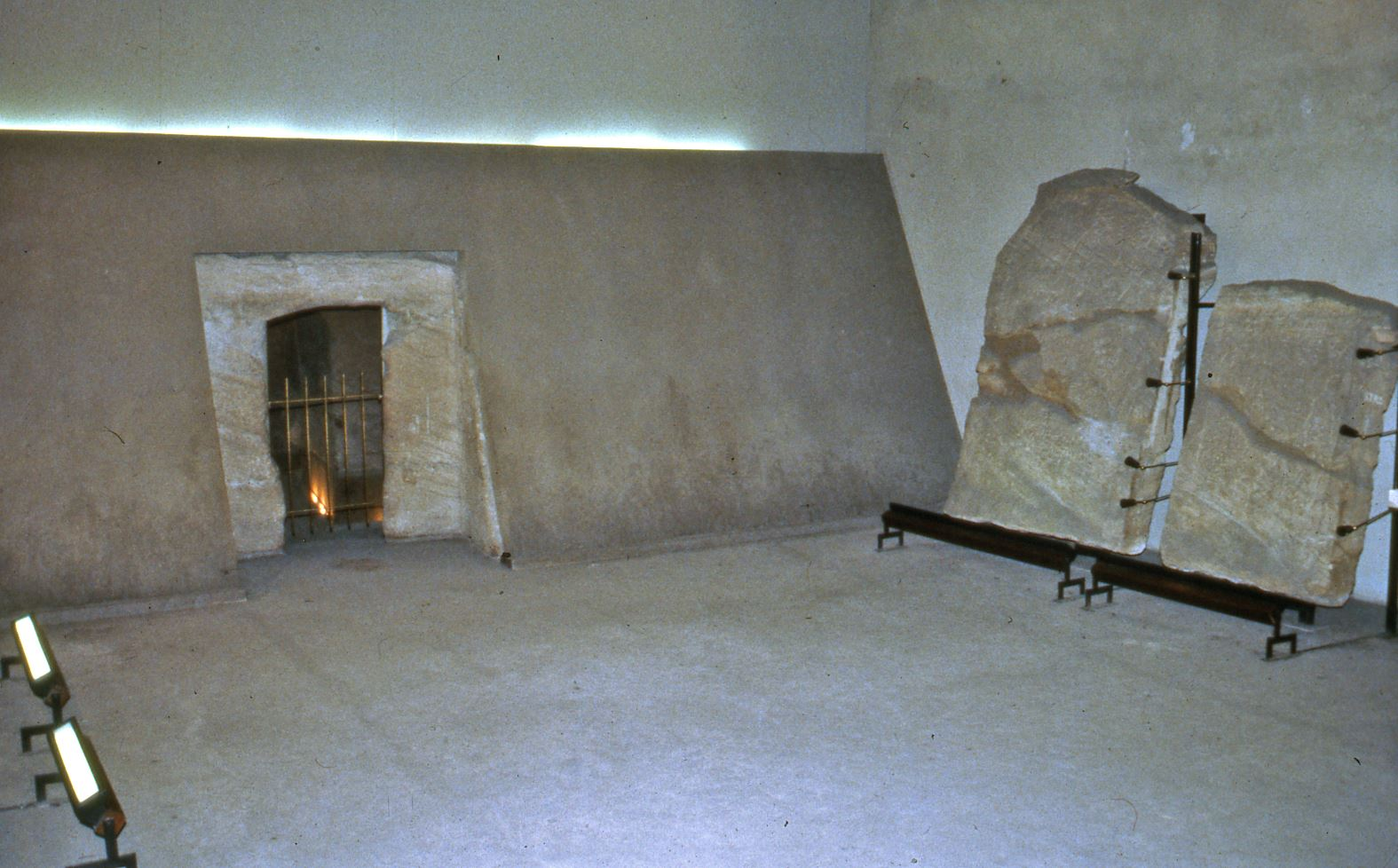

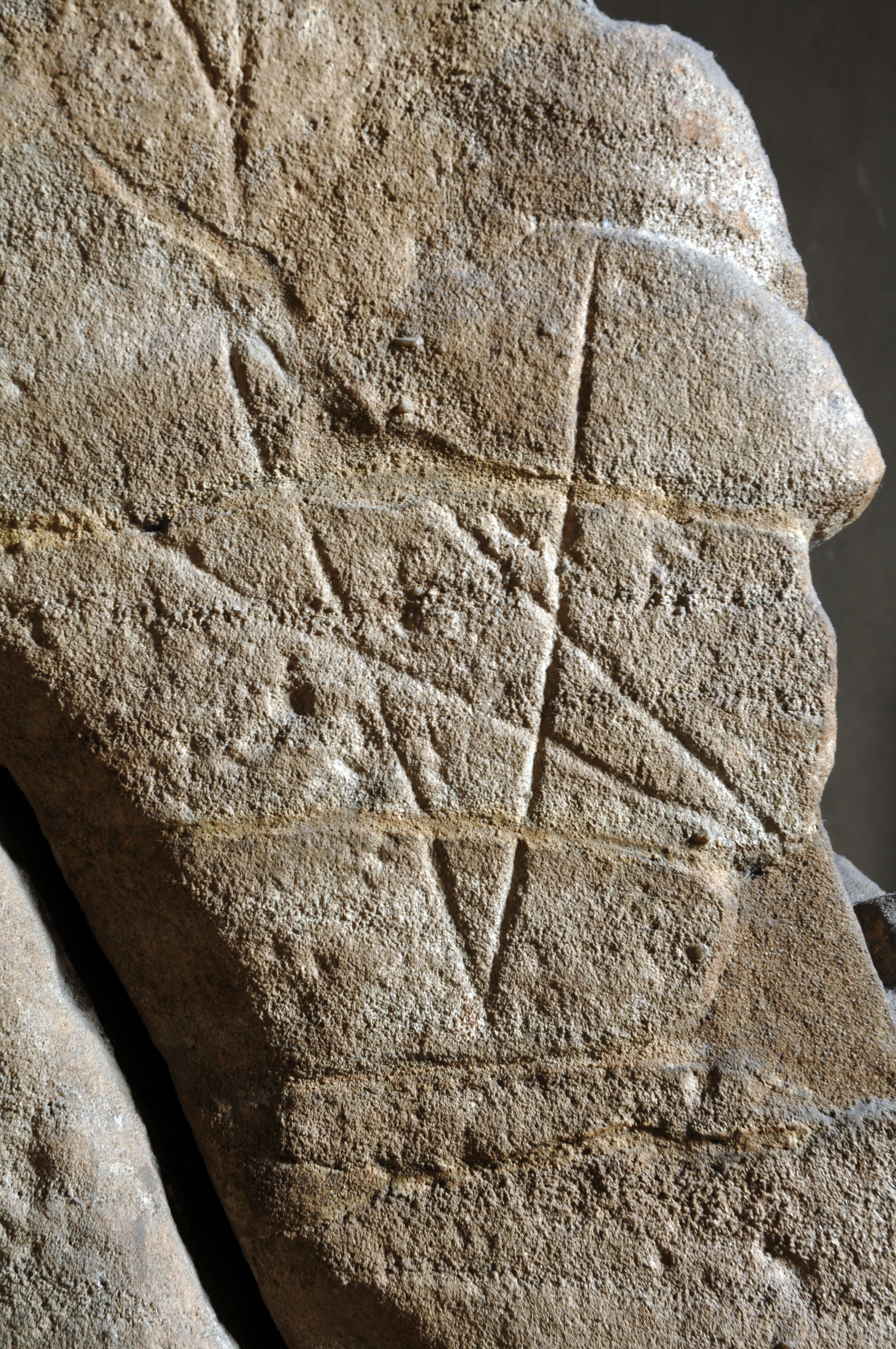
Rock carvings from the Christian era

== See also ==
UNESCO assisted in relocating and donating four other temples:

- Temple of Kalabsha to the Ägyptisches Museum in Berlin, Germany
- Temple of Taffeh to Rijksmuseum van Oudheden in Leiden, Netherlands
- Temple of Dendur to the Metropolitan Museum of Art in New York City, United States
- Temple of Debod to Madrid, Spain
