= Papenbroek Collection =

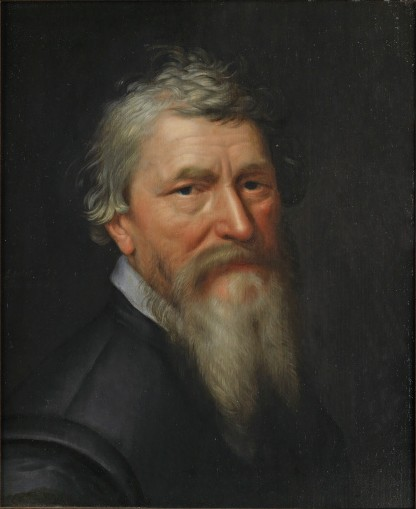
Lubbert Gerritsz. Yserman, one of the paintings in the collection

The Papenbroek Collection is one of the largest 18th-century Dutch art collections. After the death of its owner, Gerard van Papenbroek (1673–1743), the antiquities were bequeathed to Leiden University. These antiquities would become the earliest collection of the Dutch National Museum of Antiquities, and have been called a "decisive factor for the creation of the first academic chair of archaeology". The portraits and manuscripts were divided between Leiden University and the Athenaeum Illustre of Amsterdam.

== History ==
Gerard van Papenbroek was a member of the city elite in Amsterdam, had been an alderman and became a burgomaster of the city in 1723. He began collecting art, a common pastime for the elite of the period. Instead of traveling to the Mediterranean he used his fortune to buy antiquities from other collectors at auctions. In this way Papenbroek gathered a part of the Reynst Collection and pieces from many other famous and lesser known collectors, including some Roman antiquities that had belonged to the Flemish painter Rubens.

During his life Papenbroek put the collection on display in his townhouse, his country house and in the Nieuwe Kerk in Amsterdam. He attempted to have the collection published, but this would not be done until after his death.

When Papenbroek died in October 1743 his will stipulated that his collection of antiquities should go to Leiden University and was to be put on public display. The university thus gained about 150 pieces, which were welcomed with an official academic session after they had been arranged for public viewing. In 1746 a professor from Leiden published an illustrated catalogue of the collection, but after that little attention was paid to the antiquities.

Eventually the National Museum of Antiquities would be founded in the early 19th century, and the world's first professor of archaeology, Caspar Reuvens, would transform the 'archaeological cabinet' into a real museum.

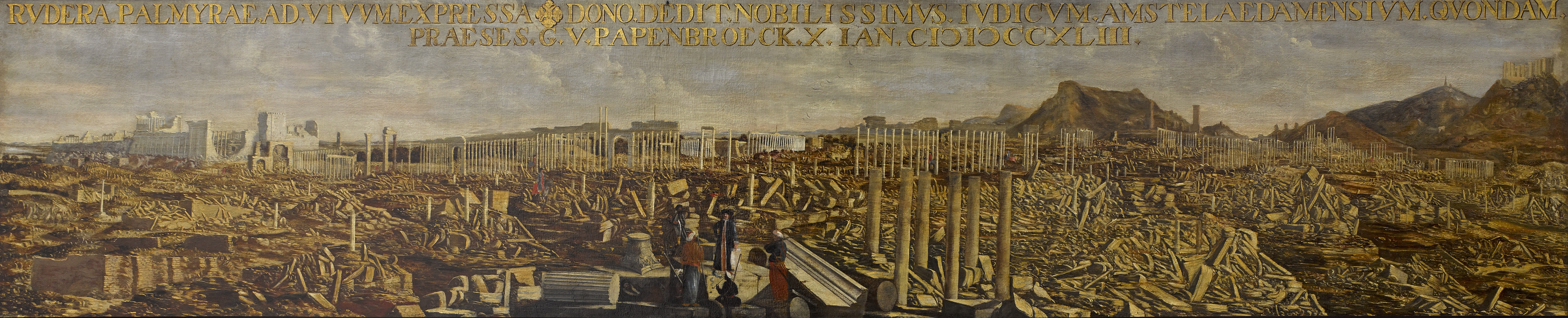
G. Hofstede van Essen, View on the ruins of Palmyra, 1693.

His collections of portraits and manuscripts were divided between Leiden University and the Athenaeum Illustre of Amsterdam. Amsterdam also received the painting View on the ruins of Palmyra, the oldest known depiction of the legendary desert city of Palmyra, in modern-day Syria, painted by G. Hofsted van Essen in 1693.
