= Frederic Count de Thoms =

German art collector

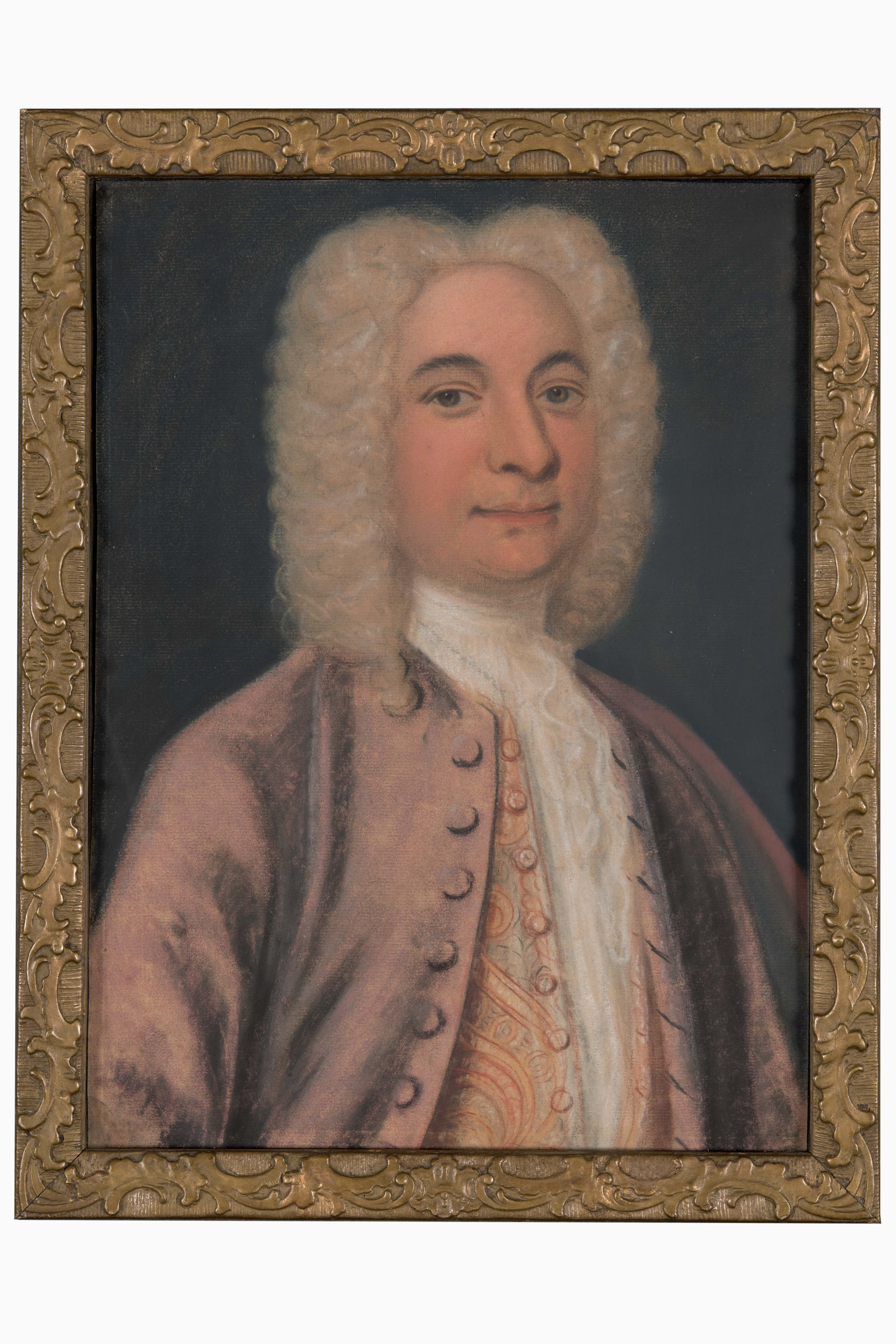
Portret van Frederic Graaf de Thoms

Frederic Count de Thoms (1669–1746) was a German art collector with various influential political ties. He was born in Giessen. He wrote a biography of Louis XIV of France in 1715, and became secretary to King George I of Great Britain in 1719. During his stay in Italy he received the title of count. In 1741 he settled down in Leiden and married Joanna Maria Boerhaave, daughter of the famous Dutch physician Herman Boerhaave. Part of his art collection is still on display in the Dutch National Museum of Antiquities and in the Geldmuseum in Utrecht. An anonymous portrait is kept by the Museum De Lakenhal in Leiden.

== Art collection ==
In the 1730s Frederic Count de Thoms lived in Naples and had begun collecting antiquities. He had bought various of the most interesting pieces from art dealers in Rome, using his considerable capital. After he settled in the Dutch city of Leiden, part of the collection was placed in Oud Poelgeest, the castle of his wife's family. The rest of the art was set in the house in the city, Rapenburg 31. During his stay in Holland De Thoms invested a lot of time and money in the private museum he was planning for himself.

After De Thoms' death at Leiden in 1746, the collection was sold to Dutch stadtholder William IV, Prince of Orange, for 30,000 guilders. The collection stayed in the Orange family until Napoleon's troops conquered the Netherlands and seized all art for transportation to Paris. In 1815, after Napoleon's defeat, the collection was returned and placed in various museums in Amsterdam, The Hague and Leiden.

== References and further reading ==
- Halbertsma, R. B. (2003), Scholars, Travellers, and Trade: The Pioneer Years of the National Museum of Antiquities in Leiden, 1818–1840, Routledge, pp. 11–14
