= Jean Emile Humbert =

Dutch soldier and archaeologist (1771–1839)

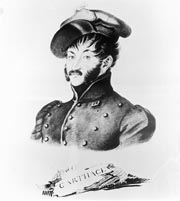
Jean Emile Humbert (Rijksmuseum van Oudheden, Leiden)

Jean Emile Humbert (23 July 1771 in The Hague – 20 February 1839 in Livorno) was a Dutch lieutenant-colonel who can be credited with rediscovering ancient Carthage. As an agent for the Dutch government he procured vital parts of the collection of the National Museum of Antiquities in Leiden. Humbert was awarded the Order of the Netherlands Lion for his archaeological work.

== Early life ==
Humbert was a son of Jean Humbert, a Dutch painter of Swiss and French extraction. His brother David Pierre Giottino Humbert de Superville was a well-known artist and scholar.

== Early career ==
As an officer in the army of the Dutch Republic he was faced with the political unrest of the Napoleon era. When in 1795 the Dutch Republic was transformed by revolutionaries into the Batavian Republic, Humbert refused to serve the new state and found his way to an engineering project in Tunisia.

In North Africa Humbert stayed with Antoine Nijssen, the Dutch consul for Tunisia. Humbert fell in love with the consul's daughter, Thérèse, and would marry her in 1801. During these years the new harbour for Tunis was built, and when the commanding officer of the project left the country for good, Humbert took charge.

== Tunisian antiquities ==
During his lengthy stay in Tunisia, Humbert became fascinated with the history of the country. He started collecting antiquities, and began compiling notes about the history, customs and language of Tunisia. He took a special interest in the peninsula near Tunis where the ancient city of Carthage had once been. Although the location of Roman Carthage was known, the exact location of Punic Carthage was a matter of dispute. After the Third Punic War the Romans had completely destroyed the site. When a century later a new Roman colony was built, all Punic remains would be swamped in the later architecture. Humbert studied the area, drew an accurate map and escorted many travelers who visited the area. This led to him becoming an expert on the topography of the ancient site.

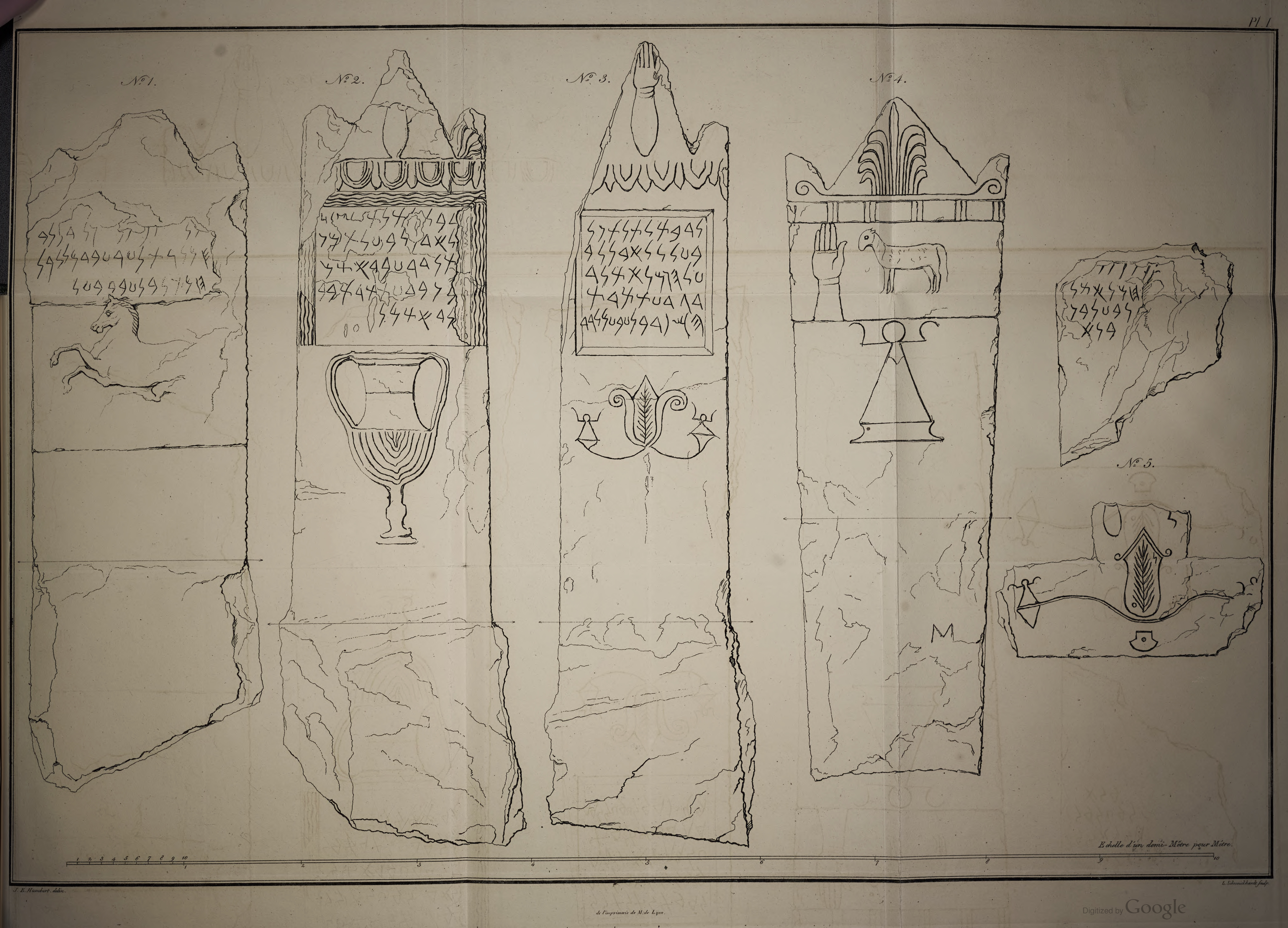
The Humbert Carthage inscriptions: The first published sketch of artefacts from Carthage. This was published in Humbert's Notice sur quatre cippes sépulcraux et deux fragments, découverts en 1817, sur le sol de l'ancienne Carthage. The artefacts were mostly Carthaginian tombstones.

In 1817 Humbert made a monumental discovery when a plowing farmer stumbled upon four Punic stelae and two fragments with Punic inscriptions on them. These were the first complete Carthaginian remains discovered since antiquity. In 1821, already back in the Netherlands, Humbert would publish the finds.

Now that the Batavian Republic had collapsed and was replaced with the Kingdom of the Netherlands, Humbert could return to his homeland. While he was gone, disaster would strike in his household back in Tunisia. Humbert's daughter and son-in-law died because of the plague and his house had to be burned down. Humbert and his wife had not only lost their loved ones, but were financially devastated as well.

When returning to the Netherlands, Humbert hoped to get his new assignment to the Indies overturned. He also tried to sell his remaining possessions, most notably his collection of antiquities. Through his contacts he met with archaeology professor Caspar Reuvens. Reuvens would prove to be enthusiastic about Humbert's knowledge of ancient Carthage, and welcomed the collection of antiquities. He valued the artefacts at 17,000 guilders. Humbert's assignment in the Indies was changed into a major's pension without assignment, so that Humbert was now free to work on archaeological projects.

== First archaeological expedition ==
Between 1822 and 1824 Humbert would go on his first archaeological expedition for the Dutch government. Reuvens wished to publish about Carthage, and with that be the first to do a serious large scale study about the city. He repeatedly noted how Carthage had been of huge importance in antiquity, but was not yet studied in modernity. Humbert was asked to conduct excavations at Carthage, buy antiquities unearthed at nearby Utica, collect Punic material and work on plans, drawings and sketches.

The Dutch Department of Education, Arts and Sciences arranged for the expedition and financed it. Humbert received an increase in his pension, and was given funds for the excavations and purchases. At this time Humbert was awarded with the Order of the Netherlands Lion, both as a reward for his troubles and in order to impress the Tunisians.

After securing a positive relationship with the ruler in Tunis, Humbert set his mind on the purchase of nine sculptures discovered at Utica. Unfortunately a top piece in the group was sold and shipped to Denmark, but Humbert managed to procure the other eight statues. These still form an essential part of the current collection in Leiden, at the National Museum of Antiquities.

Humbert continued to collect antiquities and went on to conduct numerous excavations. All of these excavations were small though, the longest one lasting only two weeks. Though there certainly were finds, none of the artifacts were very special. Most notable about these excavations is the level of precision with which Humbert conducted them, making notes and impressive drawings.

Upon returning to the Netherlands late 1824, Humbert delivered sixty-five crates full of art and artifacts. Professor Reuvens was pleased with the additions to the collection, but wanted a second expedition.

== Second archaeological expedition ==
Humbert was not at all happy to have to return to Tunisia. During the last expedition he had become increasingly depressed with the work and climate. He hoped to remain closer to home, or at least not return to the North African coast. Egypt was monopolized by France and England however, and colonel Rottiers was already working in Greece (see Rottiers Collection). Reuvens won out, arguing that Humbert knew the area the best and that much more research into the Carthaginian peninsula was needed. In the summer of 1825 a royal decree decided on a second expedition, lasting four years. Humbert was at this point promoted to lieutenant-colonel.

In 1825 Humbert was made correspondent of the Royal Institute.

=== Etruscan antiquities ===
Humbert traveled to Italy from where he would take a ship to Tunisia. Arriving in the spring of 1826 however, Humbert argued that the summer in Tunisia would be too hot to excavate. Combining that argument with the raging anti-Christian sentiments among the Tunisians, Humbert persuaded Reuvens to allow him a delay of four months. Staying in Livorno, he began collecting Etruscan antiquities and soon bought six urns.

These six urns would cause some commotion because Etruscan art was hardly known outside Italy at that point. Reuvens judged three of them to be fake, and had serious doubts about one. Humbert was not very happy with this verdict, being sure himself that the six urns were all genuine. He responded by composing a dossier about the discovery of the urns, and enlisted the aid of Italian archaeologists. Humbert had numerous compelling arguments and even proposed to ship the urns back to Italy for a public debate. The relationship between Reuvens and Humbert was considerably cooler for a while as a result of this incident, though eventually their friendship returned. Humbert would buy more urns, this time all with certificates of authenticity.

An important opportunity came when a large collection of Etruscan antiquities was offered for sale. The collection was known as the Museo Corazzi, and consisted of over 500 artifacts. Most of these were bronzes and Etruscan. Reuvens was interested in the Corazzi collection, because the study of the relatively unknown Etruscans could push Italian history back considerably. Taxating the group proved difficult though, since there were no masterpieces but Etruscan art was rare. The requested price for the collection had dropped from 60.000 guilders to 38.000, but this was still a huge amount of money and Etruscan antiquities lay outside the scope of the expedition which was supposed to be in Tunisia.

The decision to buy or not was left to the Dutch government, where discussion and correspondence took place between the king, various ministers and professor Reuvens. Financial difficulties in the Corazzi family led to the collection being offered for 5.000 guilders less, and Humbert boldly sealed the deal without permission to buy. Making clear that this was not the way things were supposed to go, the Dutch government permitted the buy after it was in fact made. The deal was not regretted, for the collection started Etruscan studies in the Netherlands. Humbert around this time also bought a smaller collection of Roman, Egyptian and Punic antiquities, and shipped everything to the Netherlands.

=== Egyptian antiquities ===
Humbert still remained in Livorno and did not cross to the destination of his second expedition, Tunisia. After considerably adding to the museums collection through buying the Etruscan antiquities, Humbert would again add an impressive amount of artifacts to the National Museum of Antiquities.

Maria Cimba, a widow, offered the Egyptian collection of her deceased husband for 14.000 guilders. Humbert had permission to offer 8.000 guilders, but someone else offerend 9.000 and the collection was sold. The other buyer could not assemble the money in time though, and Humbert managed to buy the collection for a mere 5.000 guilders. 335 Egyptian pieces were now owned by the Dutch.

A while after the purchase of the Cimba collection, a much more impressive group of Egyptian pieces was offered for sale. The more than 5600 artifacts were owned by Jean d'Anasty, a very wealthy merchant of good reputation. Humbert inspected the impressive collection and sent Reuvens the catalogue of over 110 pages. Reuvens enlisted the aid of the Dutch ambassador in Rome. The enormous amount of 200,000 guilders was asked for this collection, and negotiations would be intense.

Reuvens tried to evaluate the worth of the collection by comparing it to other large recently sold collections. Though the statues of the Anasty collection were not very impressive, there were some mummies and especially the large amount of papyri made the collection worth having. The Dutch opening bids of 50.000 guilders and then 70.000 were angrily rejected, and a representative was sent to the Netherlands to speak with Reuvens. It was clear that the negotiations were beyond Humbert at this point. Humbert was not happy with the way things were going, and thought Reuvens' taxation was much too low. Reuvens had meanwhile upgraded his estimation of the value.

In February 1828 Humbert offered the maximum he was allowed to offer, 200.000 francs or roughly 100,000 guilders. It would be yet another offer rejected out of hand, although by this time the asking price had been lowered to 300.000 francs and some objects were added to the collection. Reuvens at this point thought that 150.000 guilders, or 300.000 francs, was a fair price. The king was not pleased however. 300.000 francs was too much to spend on antiquities, and an official maximum was set on 230.000 francs. Bypassing the consul in Rome, news of this was sent directly to Humbert who made the offer. Prospects were bleak, and no-one expected that the collection would be sold for the rough equivalent of 115.000 guilders. It is a mystery why, but Anasty accepted the offer and after a year of intense negotiations the collection was in the hands of the Dutch government.

On the first day of 1829 the antiquities arrived in Leiden, and Humbert received another three items as a gift by d'Anasty. These items were offered by d'Anasty before the deal was closed, but had been kept secret by his agents in Italy. Humbert was told of it by one of them though, and confronted the other one. A Byzantine helmet, a Greek manuscript and a Greek-Demotic bilingual papyrus were added to the collection.

The second Egyptian acquisition would be the largest sum the government would ever pay, and was the largest deal of Humberts career. There remained one and a half year of time set for the expedition though. Professor Reuvens at this point understood that Humbert had no serious plans to go to North Africa and hoped to make use of Humbert as an agent in Italy. He made a few more minor purchases and returned to the Netherlands early in the 1830s.

== Life after the expeditions ==
Humbert returned to the Netherlands and began working on a publication about Carthage, trying to decipher the notes of the deceased Borgia. No plans of a third expedition ever came near to success however, and Humbert decided to return to Italy to live on his military pension. He would return once more to the Netherlands, but by that time was a sickly man. In 1839 Humbert died in Italy, bequeathing his private collection of antiquities to the Leiden museum. His gravestone claims the discovery of Carthage.

== Further reading and external links ==
- Halbertsma, R. B. (1996). The King's Collector: The Archaeological Travels of Jean Emile Humbert, Aurora.
- Halbertsma, R. B. (2003). Scholars, Travellers, and Trade: The Pioneer Years of the National Museum of Antiquities in Leiden, 1818-1840, Routledge, p. 71-111.
- Article by co-operating museums about Humbert (in Dutch).
- Freed, Joann (2011). Bringing Carthage Home: The Excavations of Nathan Davis, 1856–1859, Oxbow Books.
