= Temple of Taffeh =

Roman Egyptian temple in Leiden, Netherlands

Coordinates: 23.6197°N 32.8721°E

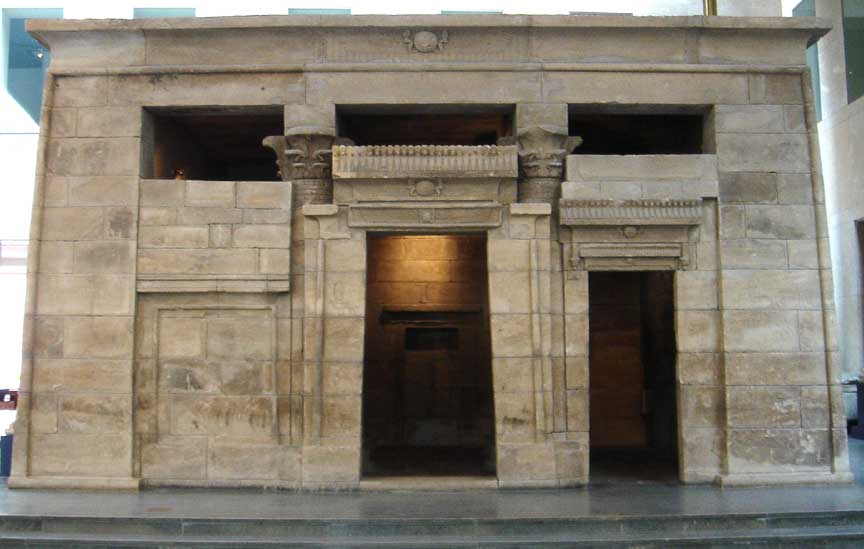
- The Temple of Taffeh in its current location
- Interactive map of Temple of Taffeh
- Location: Rijksmuseum van Oudheden, Leiden, The Netherlands

History
- Built: 25 BCE – 14 CE
- Rebuilt: 1979

Site notes
- Architectural style: Ancient Egyptian

The Temple of Taffeh is an ancient Roman Egyptian temple currently located in the Rijksmuseum van Oudheden in Leiden, the Netherlands. The temple was originally built between 25 BCE and 14 CE as part of the Roman fortress known as Taphis, in Egypt. The Egyptian government donated the temple to the Netherlands as a sign of gratitude for their participation in the International Campaign to Save the Monuments of Nubia. It is one of the few works of ancient Egyptian architecture relocated outside Egypt and the only one of its kind in the Netherlands.

== History ==
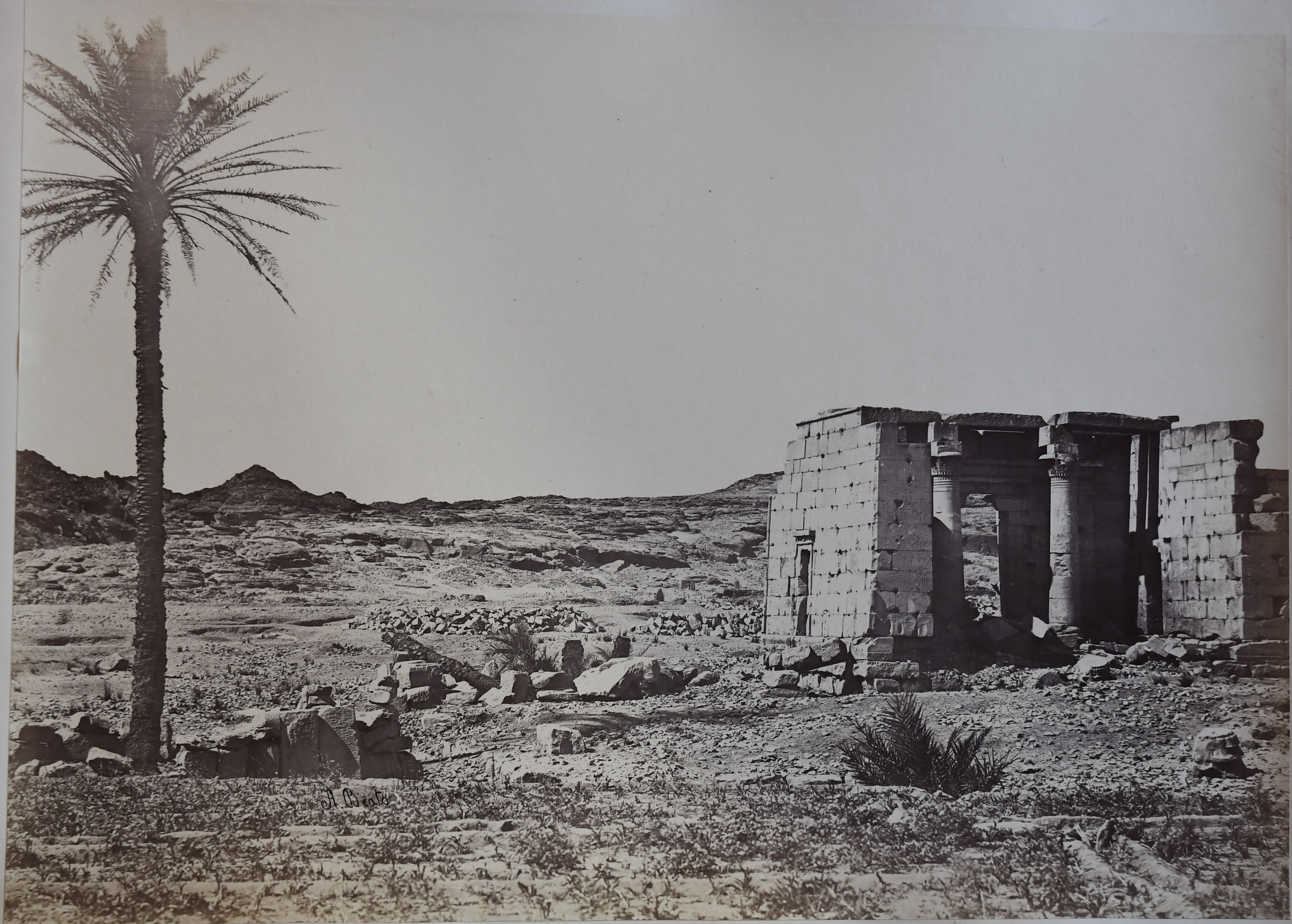
The temple in its original location in Nubia. Photo by Antonio Beato, late 19th century. Archivio fotografico Museo Egizio, Turin.

The temple of Taffeh was built of sandstone between 25 BCE and 14 CE during the rule of the Roman emperor Augustus. It was part of the Roman fortress known as Taphis and measures 6.5 by 8 metres (21 ft × 26 ft). The north temple's "two front columns are formed by square pillars with engaged columns" on its four sides. The rear wall of the temple interior features a statue niche.

In 1960, in relation to the construction of the Aswan High Dam and the consequent threat posed by its reservoir to numerous monuments and archaeological sites in Nubia such as the temple of Abu Simbel, UNESCO made an international call to save these sites. In gratitude, Egypt assigned several monuments to the countries that replied to this plea in a significant way, including the Netherlands. Adolf Klasens, the director of the Rijksmuseum van Oudheden in Leiden and a Dutch Egyptologist played a part in arranging the agreement where Egypt presented the temple to the museum.

The building is constructed from 657 blocks weighing approximately 250 tons. After arriving in the Netherlands in 1979, it was reconstructed in a new wing of the museum. The new structure was designed in such a way that the Dutch weather would not affect the stone, that natural light would illuminate the temple and that visitors could see the temple before having to pay for admission. There was also an effort to replace a minimum number of damaged stones.

A Greek inscription and a Christian cross remain carved into its walls.

== See also ==
The four temples donated to countries assisting the relocation are:

- Temple of Debod (Madrid, Spain)
- Temple of Dendur (Metropolitan Museum of Art, New York, United States)
- Temple of Taffeh (Rijksmuseum van Oudheden in Leiden, the Netherlands)
- Temple of Ellesyia (Museo Egizio, Turin, Italy)
