= Rotner =

Rotner is a surname. Notable people with the surname include:

- Karol Rotner, Israeli footballer
- Pamela Rotner Sakamoto, American historian and writer

== See also ==
- Rottner
