= Ioannis Papafis =

Greek businessman and philanthropist

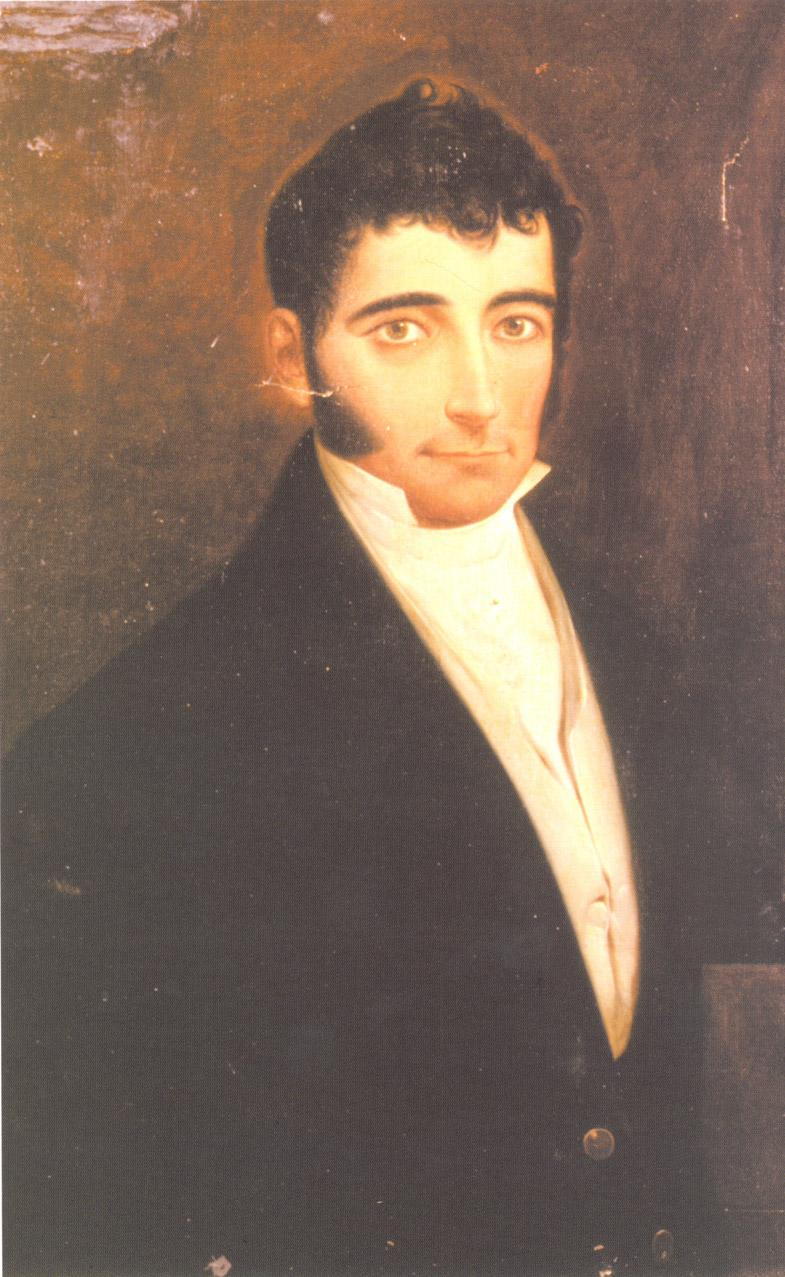
- Portrait of Ioannis Papafis
- Born: 1792; Thessaloniki, Ottoman Greece
- Died: 1886 (aged 93–94); Malta
- Known for: national benefactor of Greece

Ioannis Papafis or Giovanni di Niccolò Pappaffy (Greek: Ιωάννης Παπάφης; 1792 – 1886) was a Greek businessman and philanthropist, prominent for helping in the funding of the Greek War of Independence and in financing crucial sectors of independent Greece after its successful conclusion. He is considered a national benefactor of Greece. He was among the primary shareholders of the National Bank of Greece, donated to the University of Athens, and the Greek Orthodox Church through the Ecumenical Patriarch of Constantinople.

== Biography ==
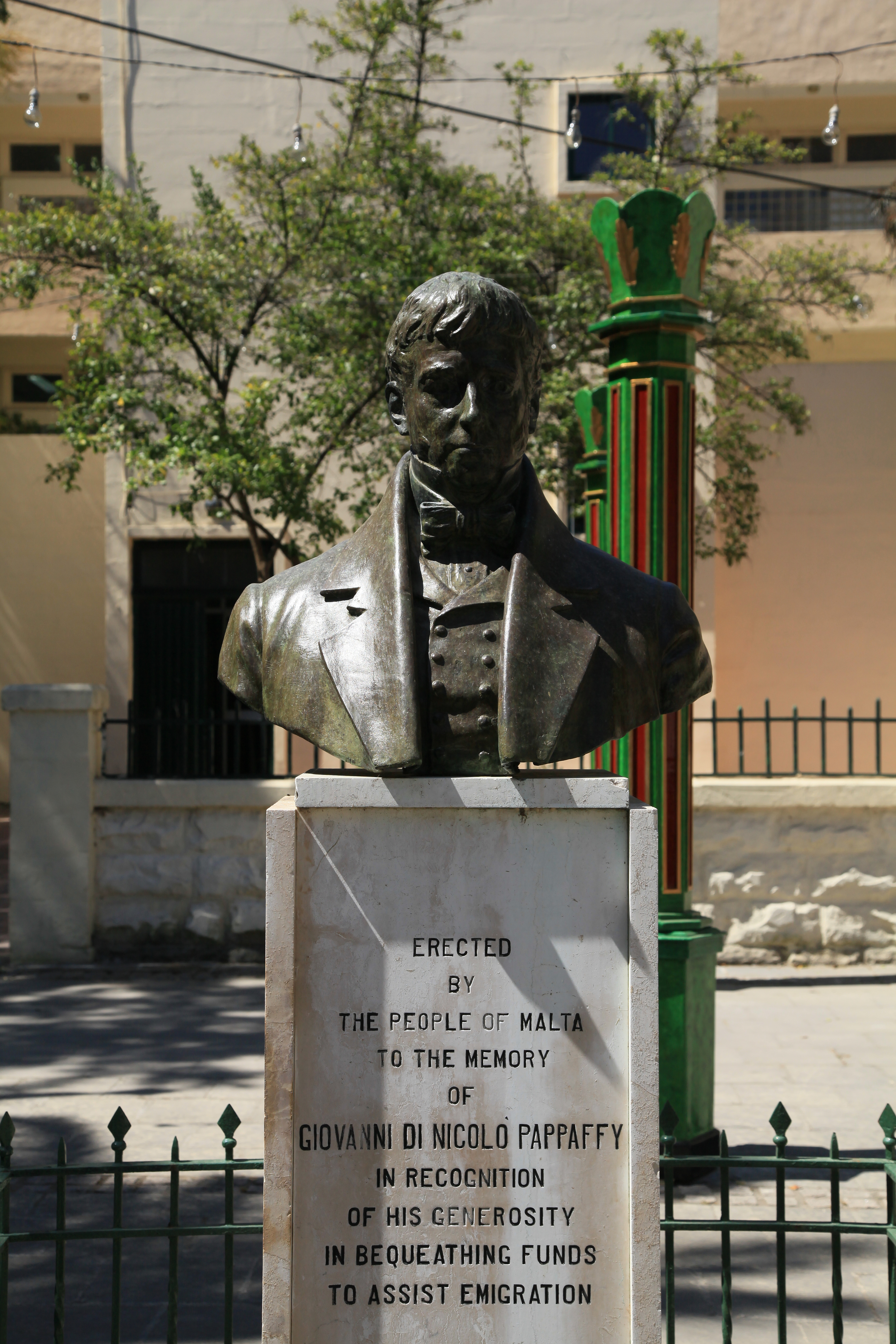
Bust of Papafis in Floriana, Malta

Papafis was born to a local Greek family in the city of Thessaloniki in 1792.

Son of Nikolaos Papafis and Tomae Anastassiou, when he turned 16 he moved to Smyrna to work with his father, a merchant, who died just two years later. His uncle Ioannis Anastasiou (Giovanni D'Anastasy, 1780/85–1859/60), prosperous merchant-entrepreneur and general consul of Sweden in Alexandria, brought him to Egypt and then sent him to Malta to open a new branch of the family business.

In Malta, a major logistics hub during the Napoleonic Wars, Papafis managed the grain trade and learned English and Italian, besides French. He was chaperoned by the British merchant Jameson Hunter and recognised a denizen of Malta on 13 March 1818, with the right to a British passport. In 1822 Pappafis was appointed a public broker for Malta, work from which he retired 15 years later in 1837 due to health concerns. He continued to deal with financial investments in European stock exchanges, advocating for trade and publishing pamphlets and newspaper articles. In 1858 he was appointed an honorary member of the Stock Exchange by the Chamber of Commerce in Malta.

Papafis married Vincenza Rosa Aquilina in 1843, the daughter of Corsican Catholic merchant Lorenzo Aquilina. They did not have children. In 1843 they moved from Valletta to Rabat, Malta. Since then, he mainly dealt with charities, in particular the welfare of orphans and poor young men. In his 1879 and 1883 wills, Papafis provided rich endowments, often anonymously, to charitable institutions in Greece, Salonica, and Malta. He kept an active lifestyle until the age of 90, managing his own investments and correspondence. He died at 94 in Malta.

His legacy of philanthropic activities include the founding of orphanages and large donations directed to educational and public services and both in Malta and Greece. He was memorialised with a bust at the Maglio Gardens in Floriana, "Erected by the people of Malta to the memory of Giovanni di Nicolò Pappaffy in recognition of his generosity in bequeathing funds to assist emigration".

== Papafeio Orphanage ==
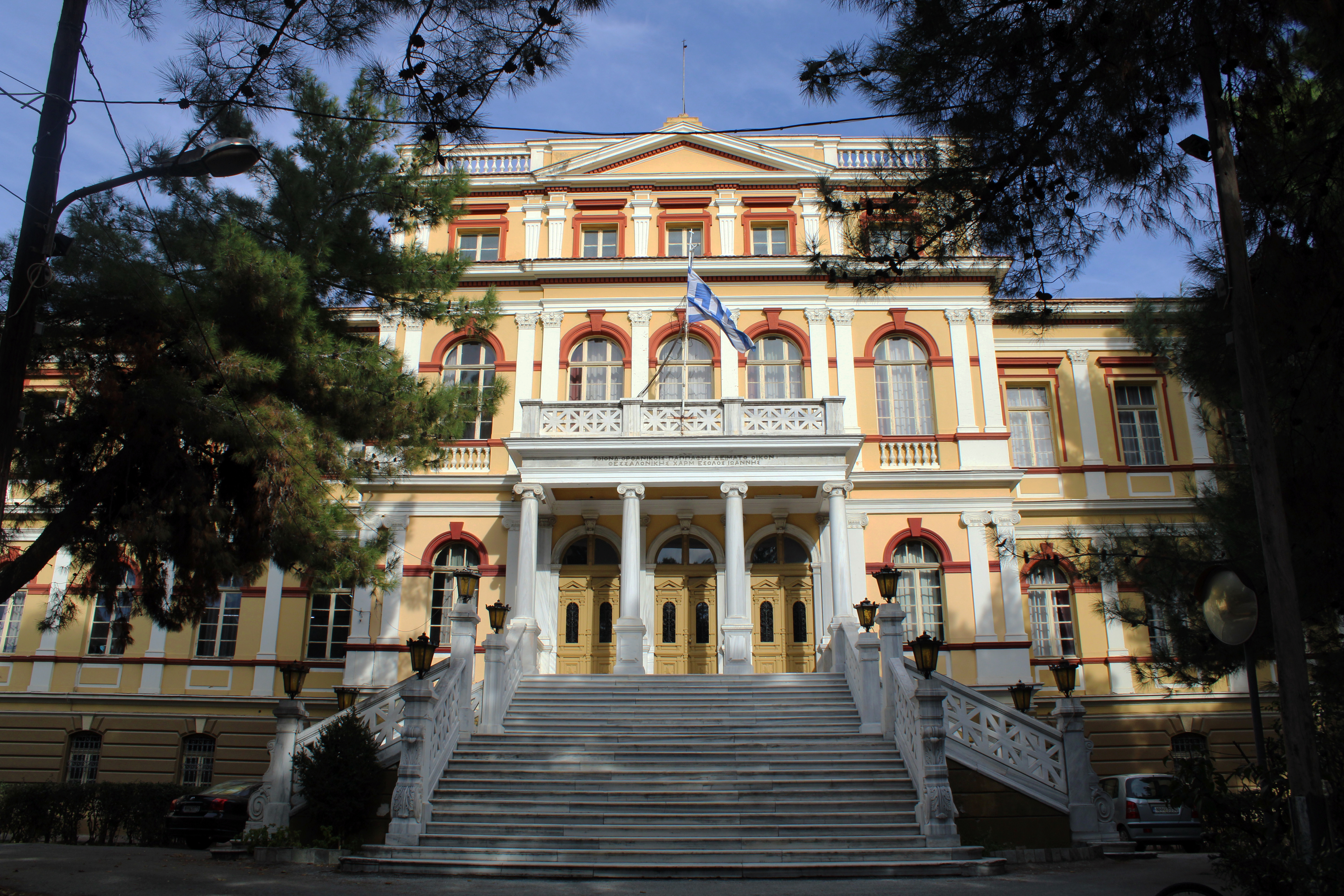
Papafeio Orphanage in Toumba

His most famous contribution was the establishment of an orphanage in Thessaloniki, which he originally named "The Maltese" (Greek: "Ο Μελιτεύς"), now commonly known as Papafeio (Παπάφειο) after him. The male-only orphanage was most active after the Greek Civil War, when it sheltered orphans that numbered in the thousands.

Designed by the architect Paionidis, the building of the Papafeio took 9 years to complete and is one of the most recent historical monuments of the city of Thessaloniki, representative of the city's architecture. At times of war and other crises it was temporarily utilized by the military, mostly as a hospital, as during the Balkan Wars and both World Wars.

Excluding the above periods, the orphanage is in continuous operation until now. As per Papafis' request, as stated in his will, the institution also provides training in a number of professions to help its graduates establish themselves professionally. By the same will, the institution is placed under the administration of the Greek Orthodox Archbishop of Thessaloniki.

== See also ==
- Emigration from Malta

== Bibliography ==
- Moutafidou, A. (2013). Giovanni di Niccolò Pappaffy: identities and philanthropies of an Ottoman Greek broker in Malta. Mediterranean Historical Review, 28(2), 191–224. doi:10.1080/09518967.2013.841616
