= Rottier (surname) =

Rottier is a surname. Notable people with the surname include:

- Simeon Rottier (born 1984), Canadian football player
- Stephanie Rottier (born 1974), Dutch tennis player

== See also ==
- Rottiers
