= Rijksmuseum van Oudheden =

National archaeological museum of the Netherlands

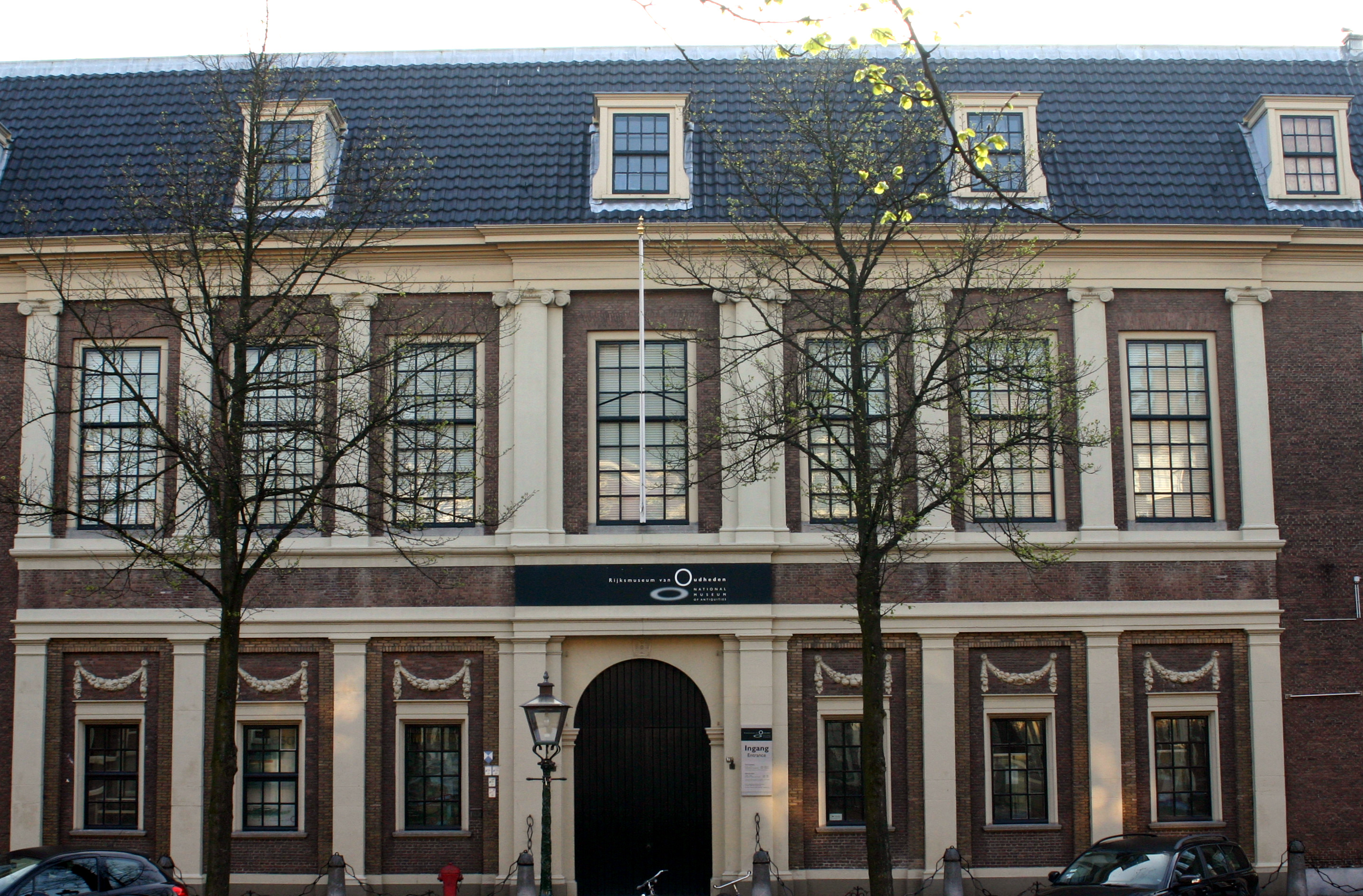
- Dutch National Museum of Antiquities in Leiden
- Interactive fullscreen map
- Location: Leiden, Netherlands
- Coordinates: 52°09′30″N 4°29′09″E

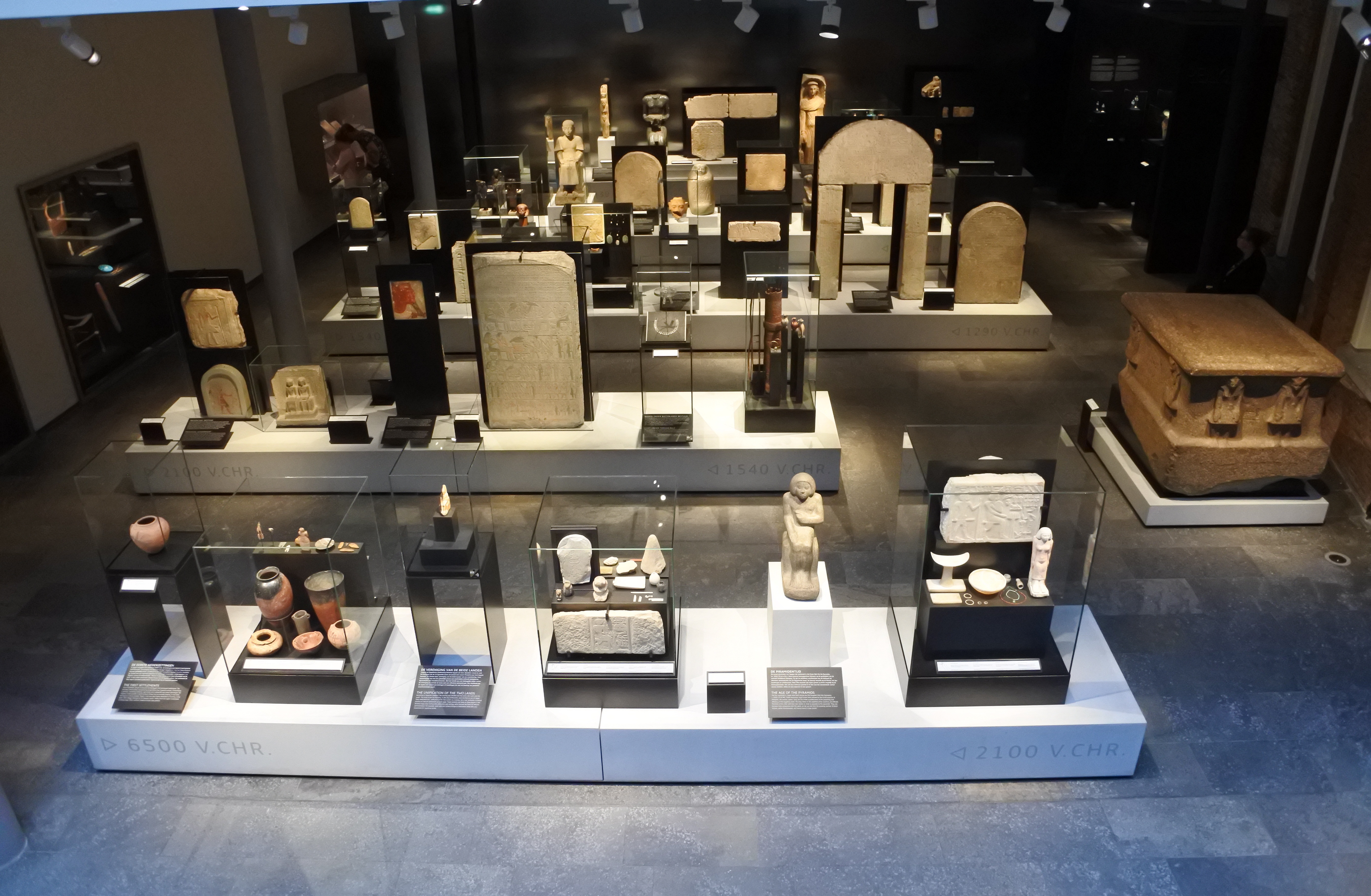
Egyptian collections of Rijksmuseum van Oudheden

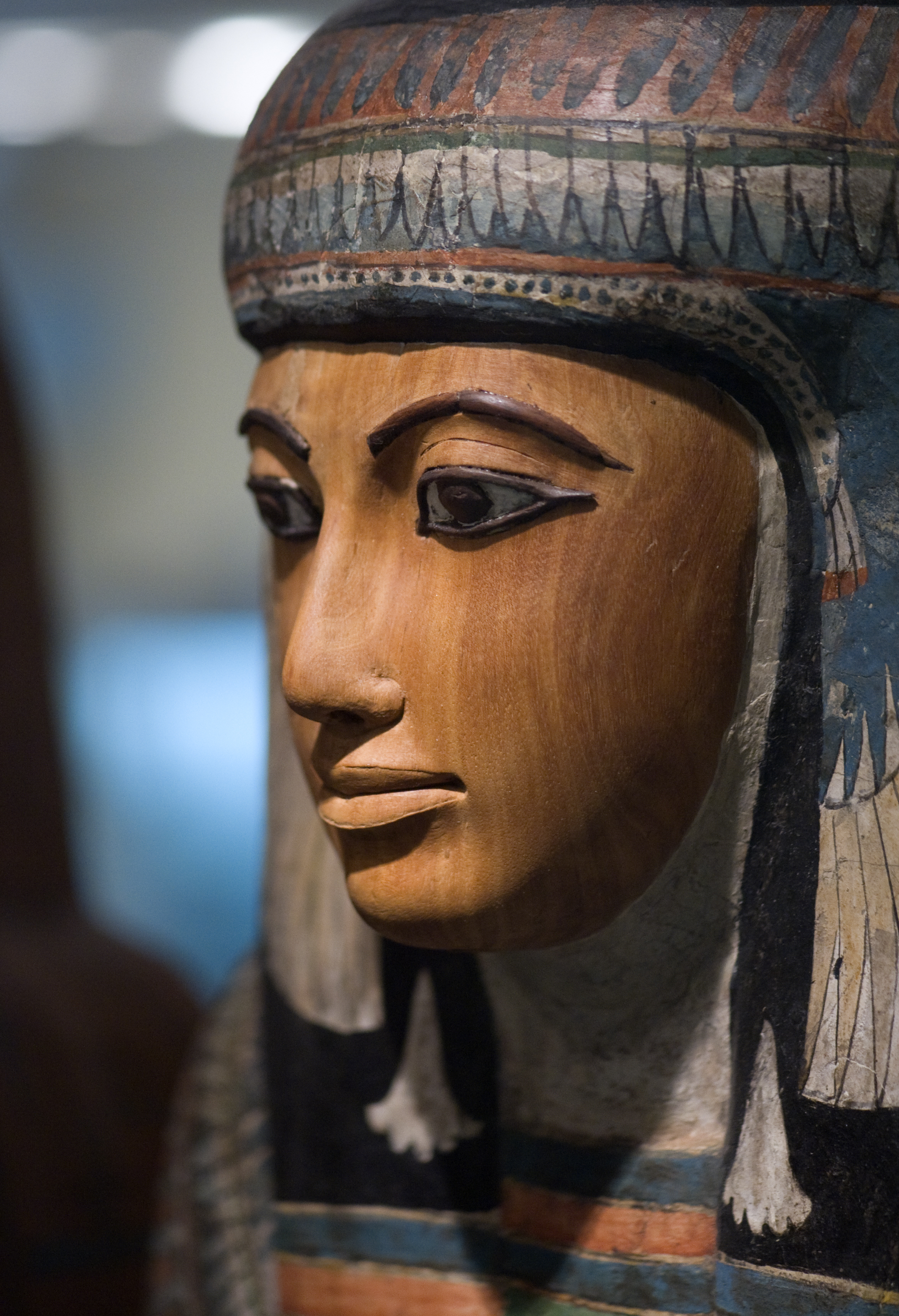
Ancient Egyptian sarcophagus at RMO

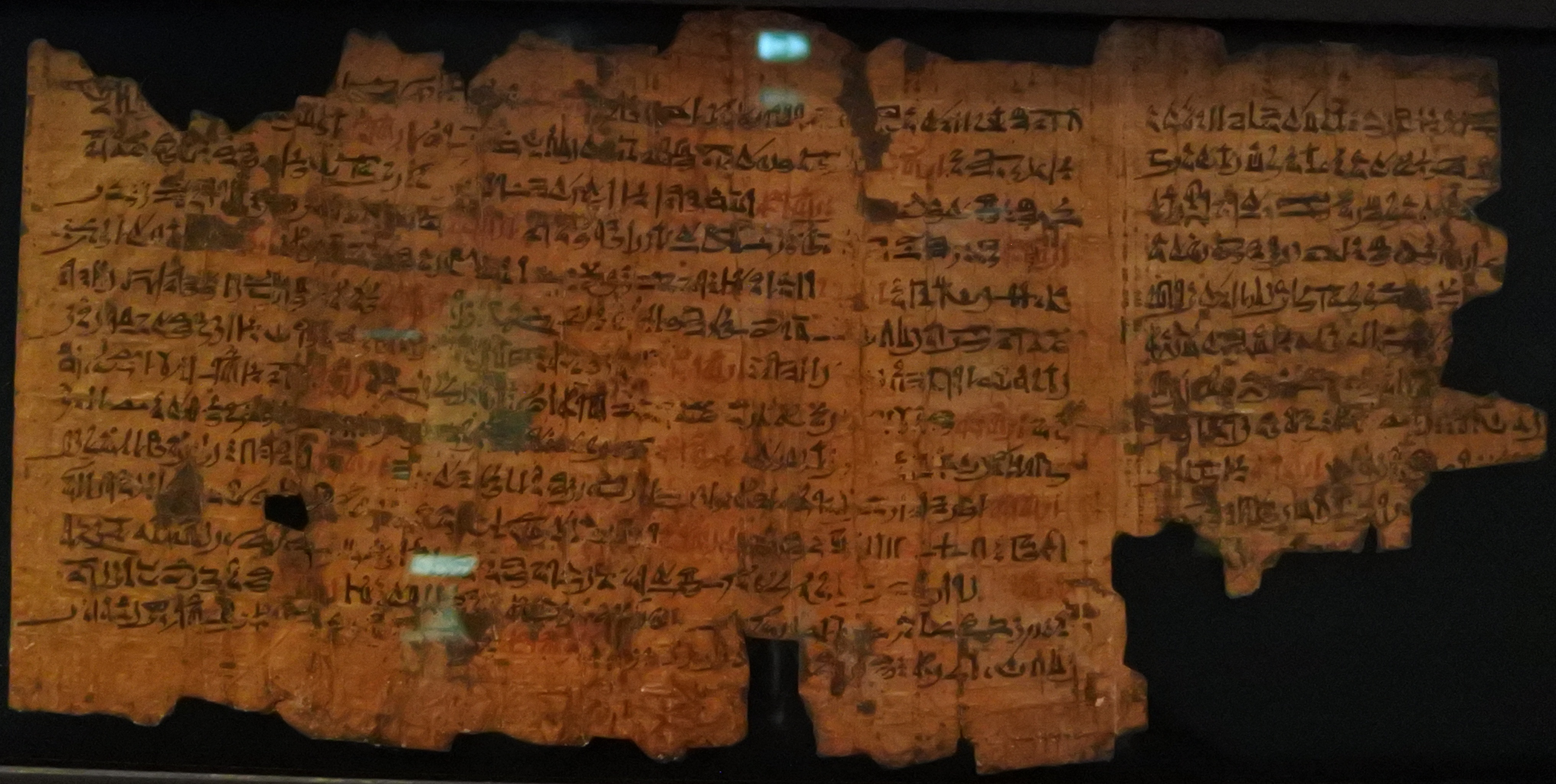
Ipuwer Papyrus describing the socio-political turmoil of ancient Egypt during one of its intermediary periods

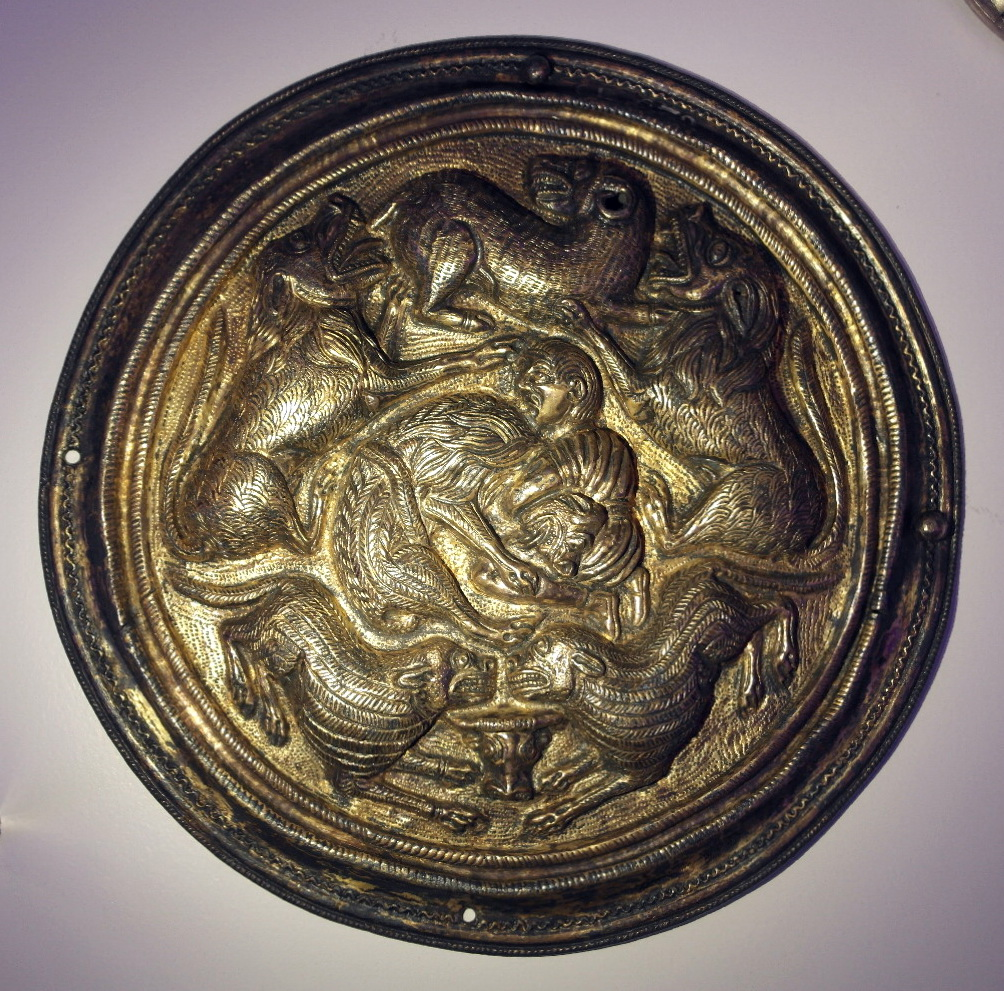
Ornamental disc (fibula) made of gilded silver. Made in Thracia around 100 BC, it was found in Limburg in 1850.

The Rijksmuseum van Oudheden (English: National Museum of Antiquities) is the national archaeological museum of the Netherlands, located in Leiden. It grew out of the collection of Leiden University and still closely co-operates with its Faculty of Archaeology. The museum calls itself "the national centre for archaeology" and focuses on ancient Egypt, the ancient Near East, the classical world of Greece, Etruria and Rome and the early (prehistoric, Roman and Medieval) Netherlands.

== Current collection ==
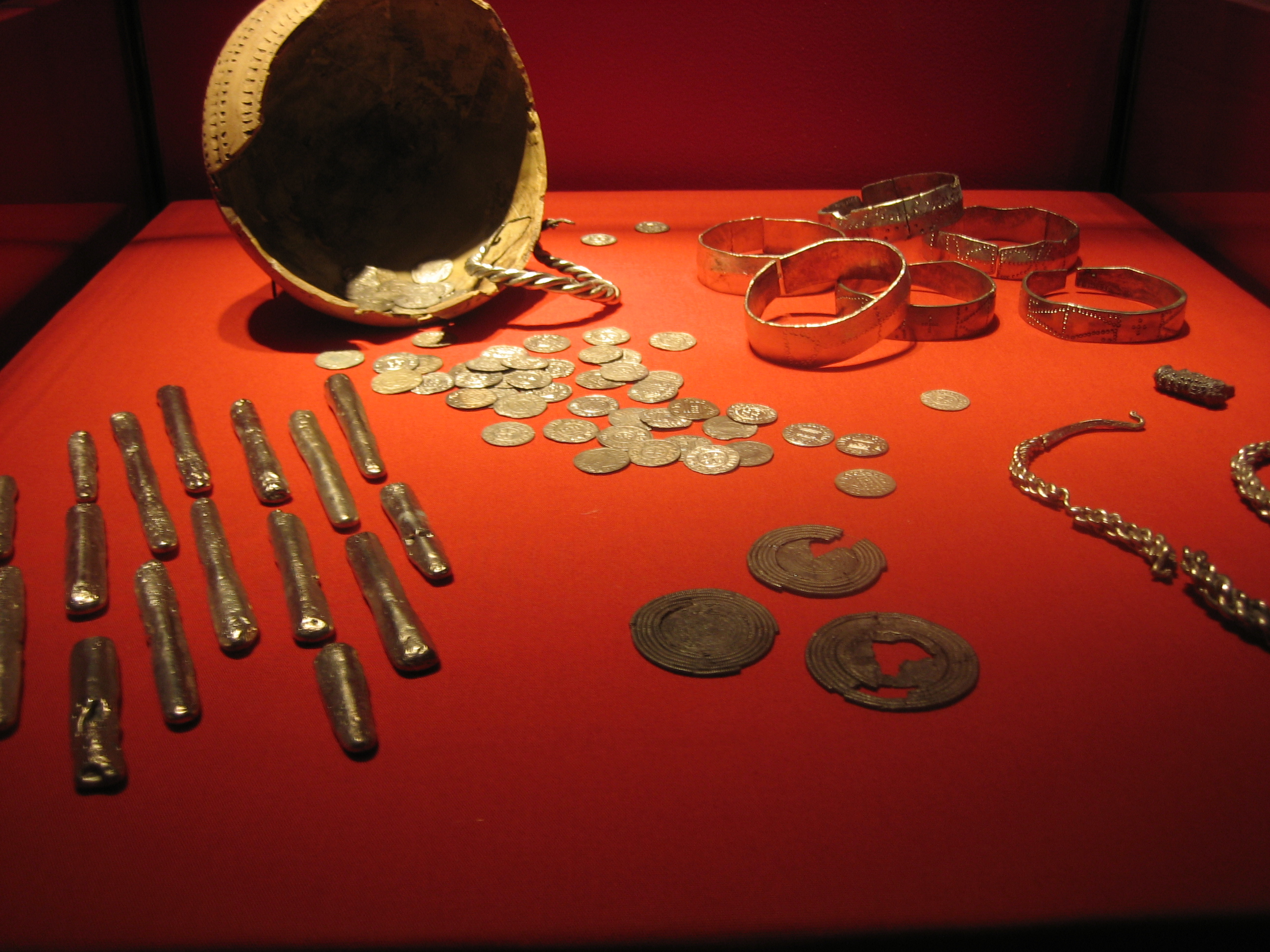
A hoard of silver Viking treasure now located in the Rijksmuseum van Oudheden.

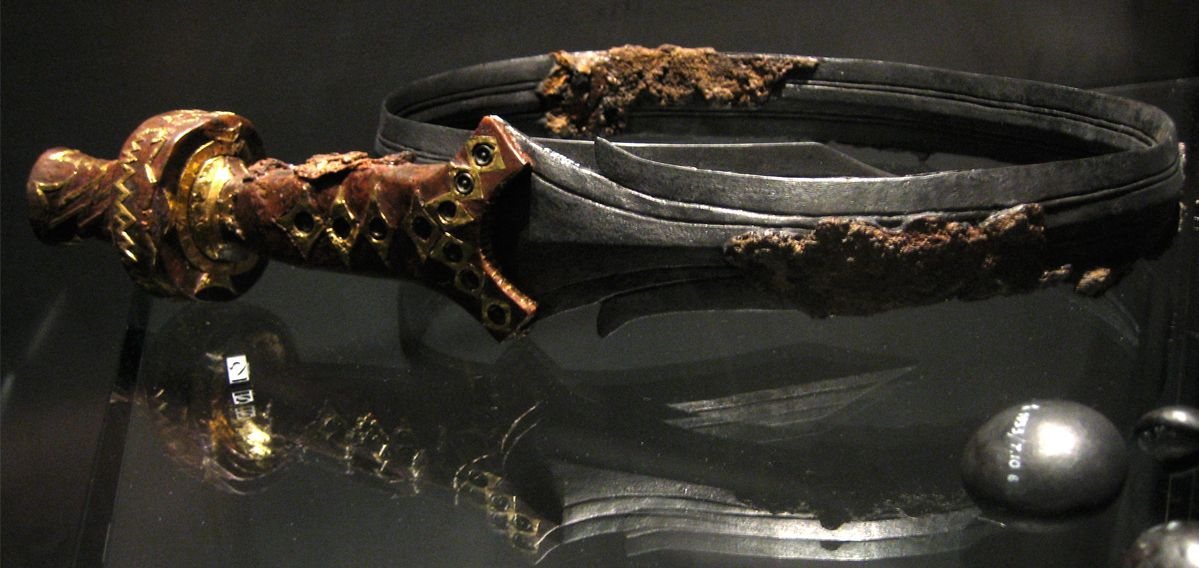
The original curved iron sword; the oldest iron object ever found in the Netherlands from the Vorstengraf (Oss)

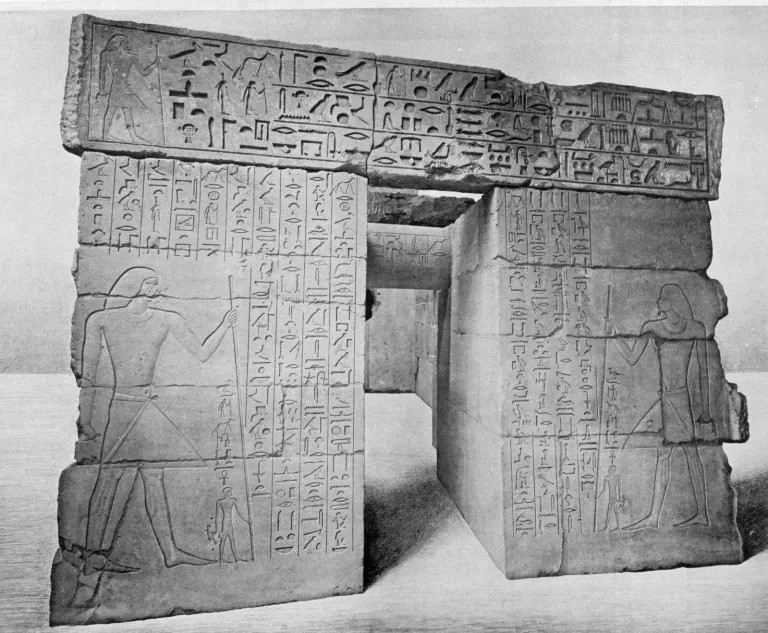
Egyptian offering chapel of Hetepherakhty (Saqqara, 5th Dynasty), photographed in 1905. On permanent display as part of the Egyptian collection.

The current collection of the museum is divided in the following categories:

- Ancient Egypt
- Ancient Near East
- Etruscan civilization
- Ancient Greece
- Ancient Rome
- Prehistoric Netherlands
- Roman Netherlands
- Medieval Netherlands

In the central hall of the museum stands an original Egyptian temple, the Temple of Taffeh, which was taken apart in Egypt and reconstructed in the museum as part of the International Campaign to Save the Monuments of Nubia.

== History of the collection ==
=== Reuvens takes charge ===
The collection of the Rijksmuseum van Oudheden began with an inheritance in 1743. After the death of Gerard van Papenbroek, his collection was bequeathed to Leiden University. The bequest comprised about 150 antiquities and was published in 1746 by a professor of the university. It was put on public display but poorly cared for until half a century later when it would finally get an official curator. This curator was classicist Caspar Reuvens, the world's first archaeology professor. Along with his duties as a professor at the university came the care of the archaeological cabinet, then consisting mainly of the Papenbroek inheritance.

Reuvens quickly added other collections from both within and outside Leiden to the university's antiquities. Antiquities from the Rijksmuseum Amsterdam were transferred to Leiden with government support in 1825. Some pieces from the Thoms Collection were among the favorites of the director of the Amsterdam museum. It was agreed that these would not be moved to Leiden until after his directorship. These became part of the Leiden collection in 1844. In 1826, a collection of prehistorical materials arrived from the Museum of Natural History.

=== The contributions of Rottiers ===
The growth of the National Museum of Antiquities would prove to be dependent much more upon foreign investments. Despite the gathering of antiquities from various Dutch organizations, the really important additions to the museum would come from buying personal collections. Among the first of these was the first Rottiers Collection. It belonged to a retired Flemish colonel who had begun collecting during a stay in Athens. In 1820, this collection was offered to the government of the Low Countries and Reuvens was sent to determine its value and recommend on whether to buy or not. Reuvens was enthusiastic about the collection because it contained original Greek sculpture and Greek pottery, categories which lacked in the Leiden collection until then. Cautioning the ministry not to buy at any price, the Rottiers collection was eventually sold for the sum of 12,000 guilders and placed in the National Museum of Antiquities.

In 1822, Rottiers sold a second collection, of smaller importance, to the government. The best piece in this collection would later turn out to be a modern cast of a marble head, a forgery. With both the first and the second Rottiers collections, the origins would remain shady. In both cases it was hinted or outright claimed that Rottiers and his son had dug up at least part of the antiquities themselves. However, in both cases it would turn out that perhaps all of the collection was bought. Rottiers also repeatedly admitted to selling forgeries and misleading buyers, but told Reuvens that he would never do so to him and that his earlier mistakes were youthful folly.

From 1824 to 1826, Rottiers made a journey through the Mediterranean, paid for by the ministry. This journey was Rottiers' own idea, and the purpose of it was to buy antiquities. Reuvens, who was not very enthusiastic about this project, was asked to provide Rottiers with instructions. During these travels Rottiers complained a lot, and for a while failed to produce any real results. The ministry had to go as far as send him an official warning to stop using government funds for anything other than buying antiquities. Plans of Rottiers' to start his own excavations were never discussed with Reuvens, and eventually Rottiers actually excavated on Melos. After this excavation Rottiers continued his travels and bought antiquities. During a lengthy stay on Rhodes, he studied and described the medieval architecture, large parts of which would later be destroyed, making the drawings commissioned by Rottiers invaluable.

In March and September 1826, the museum received the acquired antiquities. Reuvens wrote a largely negative report. Though he was pleased with some of the pieces, most were hardly special and Rottiers had not provided substantial background information.

=== The contributions of Humbert ===
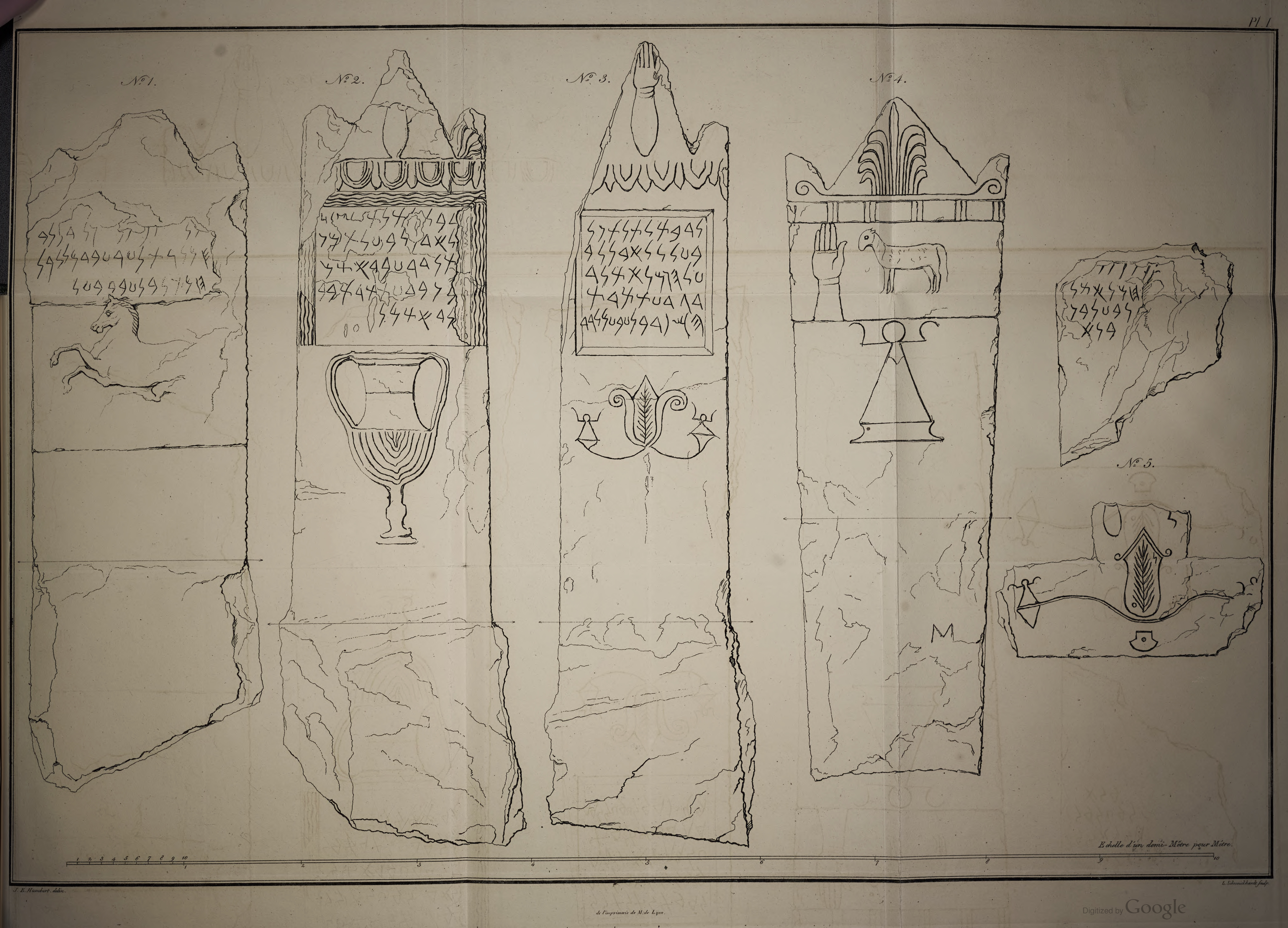
The Humbert Carthage inscriptions: The first published sketch of artefacts from Carthage, in 1817. Shortly thereafter they became amongst the museum’s most notable acquisitions.

Rottiers was not the only agent working for the Dutch government procuring antiquities however. While Rottiers was working in the eastern Mediterranean, Jean Emile Humbert was collecting and excavating in Tunisia. After selling his personal collection to the government, Humbert was asked to return to Tunisia on an archaeological expedition. Raised to the Order of the Netherlands Lion, with instructions from Reuvens and with a state-funded budget Humbert would collect and excavate antiquities in Tunisia from 1822 to 1824. Most important about this first expedition by Humbert was the acquisition of eight statues, which are still on display as centerpieces in the museum.

A second expedition by Humbert never reached Tunisia because Humbert preferred staying in Italy. Despite this blatant disregard of the agreements, the expedition did produce some considerable results. A collection of Etruscan artifacts, known as the Museo Corazzi, was bought for over 30.000 guilders but pleased Reuvens because Etruscan antiquities were virtually unknown outside Italy at the time. By far the most important deal of the expedition was the acquisition of the very large d'Anastasy Collection of Egyptian antiquities. After a lengthy period of negotiations by the Dutch ambassador in Rome and Humbert with agents of d'Anastasy the collection was eventually sold for roughly 115.000 guilders. It would be the largest deal in the careers of Humbert and Reuvens both, and provided the museum with an internationally appraised Egyptian collection.

=== Death of Reuvens ===
In the final years of Reuvens' life, there was a severe decline in governmental support for the museum. The rebellion and seceding of Belgium in 1830 were costly matters for the king, and little to no room was found for adventurous expeditions or excavations. Reuvens died in 1835, after suffering what seems to be a severe stroke by the reports. He left behind a young museum with a scholarly renowned collection, which had grown from the Papenbroek inheritance to now include a large amount of Etruscan, Egyptian, Carthaginian, Roman, Greek and other items.

=== Leemans takes over ===
After his death, Reuvens' work was taken over by his student, Conradus Leemans, who had excavated with Reuvens and was present at his death. As described below, under Leemans, the museum would finally get its own building. Prospects for continuing the growth of the collection looked bleak, however, after royal interest waned and with the enormous cost of the d'Anastasy deal still in mind. Leemans found a solution by using the official gazette to appeal private collectors, Dutch ambassadors and consuls for donations and aid in building the collection. The appeal was successful and objects from all over the world kept flowing in.

In 1839, Leemans, now appointed director, bought some 100 vases with funds from the king. They belonged to a collection that had been excavated a decade before in Italy and belonged to Lucien Bonaparte. Leemans published this collection in 1840 and had published the Egyptian collection the year before. The Etruscan collection was published by a colleague. Publications would continue and the next period in the history of the museum is described as "a period of consolidation after the restless pioneer years".

== History of the housing ==
=== Before and under Reuvens ===
Finding an adequate building for the archaeological collection had been a matter of ongoing strife between Reuvens, the trustees of the museum and the Dutch government. When Reuvens was first appointed professor of archaeology, and thereby curator of the Papenbroek collection, the antiquities were housed in a building of the botanical gardens of the university. The damp atmosphere caused serious damage to the sculptures, however, and the collection had already outgrown its housing which resulted in several statues being placed outside.

In 1821, the archaeological cabinet was moved to a new wing of the Museum of Natural History. Reuvens was unhappy with this location as well though, because it was much too small for the growing collection and because the windows provided far from enough light. In 1824, Reuvens was offered some more room of the Museum of Natural History, but Reuvens refused the insufficient extra space and proposed an entirely new building designed especially for the National Museum of Antiquities, which would also give him a lecture hall, restoration facilities and other required rooms. Reuvens plans for this new building would prove much too expensive unfortunately.

The collection continued growing however and the room granted to it was obviously insufficient. Several other solutions were sought, including redecorating a medieval church and giving Reuvens part of a new academy building. Reuvens refused these options however, because they weren't real solutions. This led to considering a much more drastic plan: moving the museum altogether to another city. Brussels, Amsterdam and the Hague were considered. Reuvens argued against all of these, using Leiden's thriving academic climate in the humanities as a main argument for keeping the collection there. Eventually, Amsterdam became the prime candidate, being the capital of the Netherlands and Brussels having seceded from the kingdom along with the rest of Belgium. Before the relocation could begin however, the academic world was shocked by the unexpected death of the still young Reuvens.

=== Under Leemans ===
Reuvens' student, Conrad Leemans, was appointed temporary curator of the collection and was asked to compile reports on the state of the museum and Reuvens' intended publications. Leemans followed Reuvens in complaining about the poor state of the antiquities due to limited finances and a poor housing. In November 1835, a turning event occurred for the museum when the university bought an 18th-century mansion and offered to place the collection there. Leemans set to work in redecorating the mansion and moving the collection to the new building. Budgetary problems and the difficulties of transporting some of the largest pieces through the city were eventually overcome and, in August 1838, the National Museum of Antiquities finally had its official opening for the public. Reuvens' collection had grown to a real museum.

== See also ==
- Temple of Taffeh
- Caspar Reuvens
- Jean Emile Humbert
- Leiden University
- Papenbroek Collection
- Rottiers Collection
- Thoms Collection
- Papyrus of Qenna
