= Caspar Reuvens =

Dutch historian and archaeologist

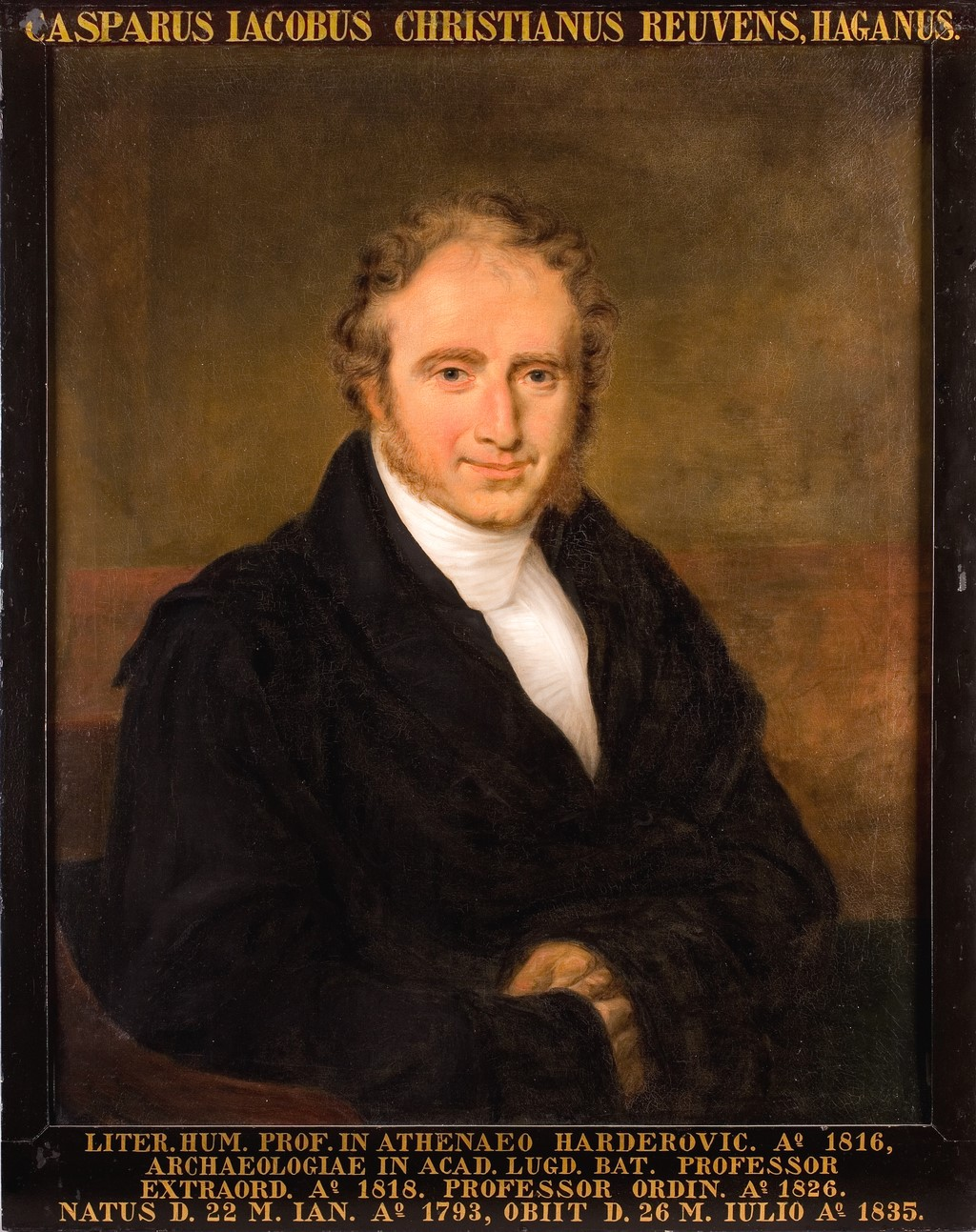
Professor Caspar J.C. Reuvens

Caspar Jacob Christiaan Reuvens (22 January 1793 – 26 July 1835) was a Dutch historian and archaeologist. He was the founding director of the Rijksmuseum van Oudheden (Dutch National Museum of Antiquities) in Leiden, the world's first ever professor of archaeology (at Leiden University), and conducted the first excavations at the Roman provincial site Forum Hadriani in the Netherlands.

== Personal life and education ==
In 1798, when Reuvens was only five years old, he lost his mother. His father was a prominent jurist, had been Minister of Justice for a short while, and filled various other important offices. Reuvens' father was transferred to Paris after the annexation of the Netherlands by France under Napoleon in 1810, so the young Reuvens lived there for some years. In 1813 Reuvens graduated from the University of Paris with a degree in law. During the reign of Napoleon, Paris received art from all the conquered nations and Reuvens studied with the famous antiquarian Vivant Denon, the director of the Louvre Museum. It has been argued that this experience in Paris would prove an inspiration for Reuvens' later efforts to establish a Dutch national museum for archaeology.

In 1814 Reuvens and his father returned to the Netherlands where they both found work as lawyers. Reuvens continued his childhood and teenage interest in the ancient world by studying and writing commentaries on Greek and Latin literature. These were published in 1815 under the title Collectanea litteraria.

In 1816 Reuvens became a professor in Harderwijk, and in 1818 at Leiden University (see below). Around this time Reuvens' father was killed in Brussels as a key witness in some sort of scandal. The details of the murder case remain unsolved.

In 1822 Reuvens got married, and three children would follow within the decade. Reuvens died in 1835, aged only 42, of what seems to have been a stroke. He is buried in Leiden.

== Professorships ==
The newly established first king of the Netherlands, William I, attempted to restart the University of Harderwijk in 1815. Caspar Reuvens was appointed professor of Greek and Latin there, and began his teaching in 1816. In 1816 he became correspondent of the Royal Institute and six years later became a member.

In 1818 the Ministry of Education aborted the unsuccessful attempt to start a school at Harderwijk. There were only six professors, of which Reuvens was one. His area of expertise, Latin and Greek, did not have any vacancies at other universities though. At this point the Minister of Education wrote a letter to King William I suggesting a professorship of archaeology for Reuvens, as the young man showed a keen interest in antiquities. The king signed the royal decree on 13 June 1818, making Reuvens the world's first archaeology professor.

== Rijksmuseum van Oudheden ==
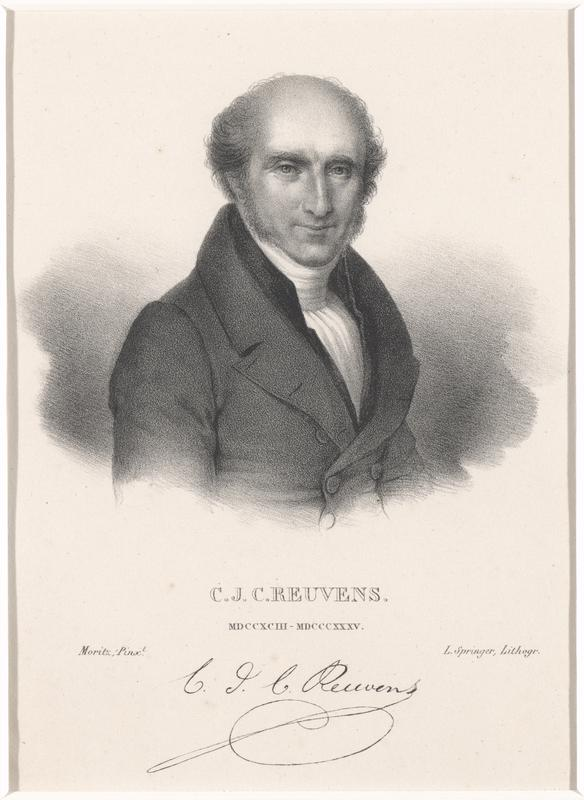
Caspar Jacob Christian Reuvens

With Reuvens' appointment came the directorship of the archaeological cabinet of Leiden University. This collection of antiquities consisted of the inheritance of the Papenbroek Collection which came into the university's possession in 1743.

Immediately upon starting his teachings in Leiden, Reuvens boldly requested a new building for the collection, the creation of an archaeological library and had several other demands for the trustees. Apart from a few elementary needs for his teachings, most of the requests were ignored and did not receive any response. When in 1819 Reuvens directly approached the minister of education for funding, he discovered that this straight line to the government was a much more fruitful way of gaining funds than through the trustees. The Ministry of Education paid for casts of the Elgin Marbles and their transportation to the Netherlands, without having the university involved.

Reuvens quickly added several other university collections of antiquities to the Papenbroek Collection, and thereby extended the variety to include Egyptian artefacts. With government support he began gathering various collections from outside Leiden as well, and occasionally he received personal gifts for the archaeological cabinet. Some organizations did not mind parting with their antiquities, since they were often an alien group of objects among larger collections of for example biological or geological specimens. Other organizations fought academic and political battles with Reuvens. (Also see Rijksmuseum van Oudheden).

With the help of the Department of Education, Arts and Sciences, Reuvens added other collections to the museum during the 1820s. This includes the three Rottiers Collections. Reuvens would later discover that Colonel Rottiers would not hesitate to sell forgeries, and the two had a fall out. During the same period a long friendship with Major Jean Emile Humbert began, and the two worked together on the research and publication of ancient Carthage. This co-operation would prove to be of major importance to the collection of the museum and the careers of both Reuvens and Humbert. Humbert went on two archaeological expeditions, one to Carthage and one to Italy, as an agent for the Dutch government. Sending his reports and catalogs of collections on sale directly to Reuvens, the co-operation of the two men would bring important additions to the National Museum.

In 1830 Reuvens published parts of a papyrus in the Leiden collection, and for that is credited with beginning the scholarly study of papyri.

On his way back from England in 1835 Reuvens became severely ill and probably suffered a stroke. He died young, leaving the National Museum of Antiquities with a considerable collection as his legacy.

== The Forum Hadriani excavation ==
Reuvens would lead the first professional excavation in the Netherlands. Located in the modern town of Voorburg (just outside of The Hague), excavations of the Forum Hadriani began in 1827 and would last through 1833. The whole project was hampered by bad weather and budgetary problems, but Reuvens demonstrated meticulous recording methods and invented techniques for field archaeology along the way.

Reuvens moved his family and two of his students into a country house on the purchased land. He organized tours and hired locals for menial tasks. A wide range of artifacts were discovered on the site. These included coins, shards of pottery, jewelry, a bronze statuette of a dog, and even human remains.

Correspondence of the time shows Reuvens persistent in trying to persuade the government of the value of excavating. When Belgium seceded from the kingdom in 1830, archaeology was the last thing the treasury could indulge, and eventually the estate was sold. The result of the project was unsatisfactory, though it had been the first professional archaeological field project conducted in the Netherlands. Reuvens findings would not be published until 1923 when the site had been revisited by archaeologist and RMO director Jan Hendrik Holwerda.

== Important events in the life of Reuvens ==
- 1793 Birth in The Hague
- 1813 Doctoral Thesis
- 1816 Professor at Harderwijk
- 1818 Appointed professor extraordinarius of Archaeology at Leiden University
- 1822 Marriage
- 1827–33 Directs excavations at Forum Hadriani
- 1835 Dies in Rotterdam, age 42

For a more extensive list, see Halbertsma (2003)

== See also ==
- Rijksmuseum van Oudheden
