= Rottiers Collection =

The Rottiers Collection refers to three 19th-century art collections that became an integral part of the collection of the Dutch National Museum of Antiquities. The first two collections were personal and sold by Flemish Colonel B.E.A. Rottiers to the Dutch government, the third was gathered by the colonel on a government-backed mission with the express purpose of collecting art.

== First collection ==
Rottiers had gathered the first collection of antiquities during a stay in Athens. He used a network of influential diplomats to acquire and export the objects. Where he had in fact gotten them from remained vague. Rottiers himself stated that he had excavated and been rather lucky, but others claimed that he had not found anything and then simply bought the items from them.

The first of Rottiers' collections was offered to the Dutch government in 1820. The Department of Education, Arts and Sciences Enzo in turn wrote to archaeology professor Caspar Reuvens, asking him to evaluate the collection and give advice. Reuvens was enthusiastic about the antiquities, mainly because they were Greek originals which the growing museum did not yet have. The Dutch government bought the collection for 12,000 guilders from Rottiers, and placed it in the National Museum of Antiquities in Leiden.

== Second collection ==
Soon after Rottiers had sold the first collection to the Dutch government, he offered a second one. This collection was of less importance, but would still be welcome in the museum. The collection was bought for 2500 guilders.

As with the first collection, the provenance of the objects was unclear. Rottiers had claimed that this time one of his sons had found the antiquities, but Reuvens would discover years later that this collection too had been bought. Worse was the discovery that the best piece in the collection turned out not to be a bronze Greek original, but a modern cast of a marble head. It is unclear how much of this Rottiers knew, but it is certain that he had deliberately added the bronze head to the collection in Antwerp, and that his son had not found nor bought it.

== Third collection ==
The third collection was not a privately gathered collection of antiquities by Rottiers, but the result of an Aegean expedition financed by the Dutch government. The express purpose of the expedition was for Rottiers to collect art and other antiquities. During the expedition Rottiers organizes a small excavation on Melos, makes an elaborate study of the medieval architecture on Rhodes, and eventually does deliver antiquities to the Leiden museum in several shipments. By that time Rottiers' credibility was in serious doubt though, and his frequent complaints and apparent abuse of government funding did not help. The final evaluation of the expedition was mainly negative, as Rottiers had promised to deliver a lot and ended up doing just one excavation of only 10 days, spending a lot of time on medieval architecture and had not bought any first class antiquities.

== See also ==
Rijksmuseum van Oudheden
