= Superville =

Superville is a surname. Notable people with the surname include:

- Daniel de Superville (disambiguation), multiple people
- David Pierre Giottino Humbert de Superville (1770–1849), Dutch artist and art scholar
- Jean Humbert de Superville (1734–1794), Dutch painter
- Lennox Superville (born 1942), Trinidadian-American professor, mathematician, and engineer
- Odile Baron Supervielle (1915-2016), Uruguayan-born Argentine writer, journalist
