= Mark Duncan =

Mark Duncan or Marc Duncan may refer to:

== Renaissance ==
- Mark Duncan (regent) (1570?–1640), Scottish regent of the University of Saumur
- Mark Duncan de Cérisantis (died 1648), son of the preceding, French and Swiss diplomat, and secretary to Henry II, Duke of Guise

== Music ==
- Mark Duncan, English bass guitarist with The Dogs D'Amour in the 1980s
- Marc Duncan, American bass guitarist with Prayer for Cleansing in the 1990s
- Marc Duncan, English member of The Rockingbirds

== Politics ==
- Mark Duncan (politician), American politician from New Mexico

== Television ==
- Mark Duncan, creator of several Bill & Ben Video Doctor Who episodes
- Mark Duncan, played Mark Tanner in Swift and Shift Couriers, Australian comedy series

== Sport ==
- Mark Duncan (coach), American football player and coach, and basketball coach
- Mark Duncan, played basketball for Scotland at the 2006 Commonwealth Games
- Mark Duncan, interim Denver Pioneers men's basketball head coach in 1943
- Mark Duncan, Kiama Knights rugby league player; 2004 Group 7 Player of the Year
- Mark Duncan, wide receiver on the 2009 Delaware Fightin' Blue Hens football team
- Marc Duncan, Dutch MMA fighter, lost a 2006 It's Showtime 70MAX MMA Championship title fight
