= Matthäus Schwarz =

German accountant (1497–1574)

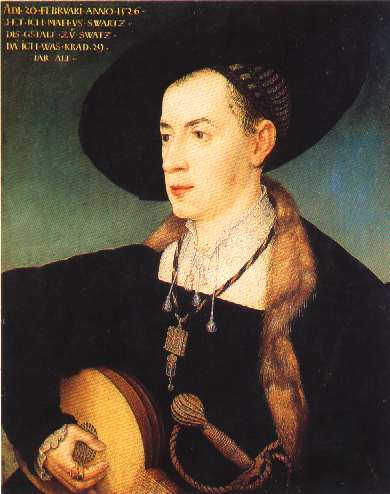
Portrait of Matthäus Schwarz by Hans Maler zu Schwaz, 1526, Musée du Louvre

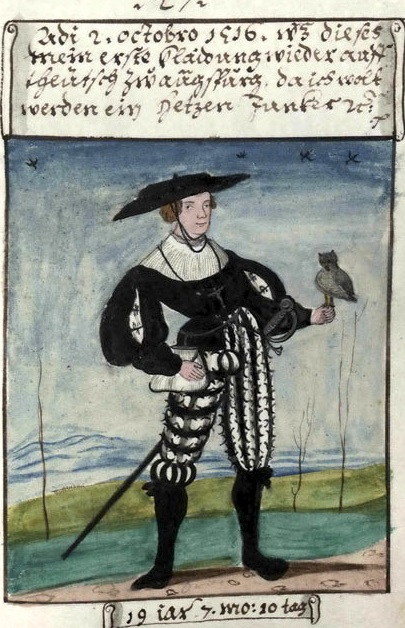
Matthäus Schwarz at the age of 19. A typical page from the Trachtenbuch.

Matthäus Schwarz (19 February 1497 – c.1574) was a German accountant, best known for compiling his Klaidungsbüchlein or Trachtenbuch (usually translated as "Book of Clothes"), a book cataloguing the clothing that he wore between 1520 and 1560. The book has been described as "the world's first fashion book".

== Early life ==
Schwarz was born in Augsburg, the son of Ulrich Schwarz the Younger, a wine merchant. His family were originally carpenters from Rettenbergen in Bavaria, but moved to Augsburg in the 15th century. His grandfather, also Ulrich Schwarz, became master of the carpenters' guild in Augsburg, and served as mayor of Augsburg from 1469 to 1477, but fell from power after disputes with the leading families in the city and was executed in 1478.

Schwartz was educated in Augsburg and Heidenheim. His mother died in 1502. His Latin was not good enough for him to emulate his brother by becoming a monk, so he worked for his father and then became a merchant's apprentice in Milan and Venice, where he learned accounting techniques.

== Professional career ==
He began to work for the wealthy Augsburg merchant Jakob Fugger in 1516, and wrote manuscript on accounting entitled Dreierlay Buchhaltung (three-fold bookkeeping) in 1518. The work remained unpublished but was rewritten by Schwartz in 1550 and eventually published in the early 20th century. Fugger, known as Fugger of the Lily or Fugger the Rich, was a member of the Fugger family of bankers and merchants, who accumulated great wealth as banker for the Habsburg dynasty before his death in 1525. Fugger bequeathed assets worth over 2 million guilders to his nephew, Anton Fugger, for whom Schwartz also worked.

Schwarz's father died in 1519. The same year, Schwarz started an autobiography, De Wellt lauff ("The way of the world"), which has not survived.

== Book of Clothes ==
Schwarz was fascinated by clothing, spent a large part of his income on clothes, and documented his appearance and outfits throughout his adult life. He would have needed a servant to enable him to dress. This was from a time in history when it was, in recent times, generally thought that interest in fashion and sumptuous dressing was for the high ranks of society and aristocracy only, and when sumptuary laws stipulated the dress and jewelry appropriate for a person's social rank and station; Schwarz dressed carefully not to break the law, for example wearing fancy sleeves if fancy hose were forbidden.

From 1520 to 1560, he commissioned artists to make accurate watercolor paintings of him on parchment, showing him in his fashionable dress, possibly as an appendix to his autobiography. The works includes 36 images by Narziss Renner in 1520 which reconstruct Schwartz's life to that point, from his birth, as an infant, schoolboy, and apprentice. Schwartz commissioned 101 more images over the next 40 years, mostly by Renner until 1536 and then by artists from the studio of Christoph Amberger. The portraits include front and rear nude portraits of Schwartz in 1526 aged 29 (when he had become "fat and large" - some of the earliest fully naked male images in Northern European art), and his recovery from a stroke aged 52, as well as pictures of his festive clothing for the visit of Maximilian I, Holy Roman Emperor for the Diet of Augsburg in 1518, for Anton Fugger's wedding in 1527, and for a visit of the Ferdinand, Duke of Austria in 1530, the somber black mourning robes for his father's death in 1519, and ending with a picture of Schwartz as an old man mourning the death of Anton Fugger in 1560. Schwartz added manuscript comments to the images explaining when each outfit was worn, and his Latin motto, Omne quare suum quia (every why has a because).

Schwartz had the completed work bound into a book chronicling his life that he called his Klaidungsbüchlein (literally, "clothing booklet"), but now known as his Trachtenbuch ("Book of Clothes"). Parallels can be drawn with the Emperor Maximilian's heavily illustrated semi-autobiographical works, Theuerdank, Weisskunig and Freydal. Schwartz encouraged his son to continue the project, but the latter soon lost interest. Schwartz has been nicknamed "Kleidernarr" (literally "clothes-fool"), although Groebner speculates that the meticulous cataloguing of his clothing may be an extension of his accountant's desire to document everything.

The original book of clothes is conserved by the Herzog Anton Ulrich Museum in Braunschweig. There are also two copies, made in 1740, one in the Bibliothèque nationale in Paris and the other in the Gottfried Wilhelm Leibniz Bibliothek in Hanover. A detailed account of the work was published by art historian August Fink in Die Schwarz'schen Trachtenbücher (Berlin, 1963).

== Later life ==
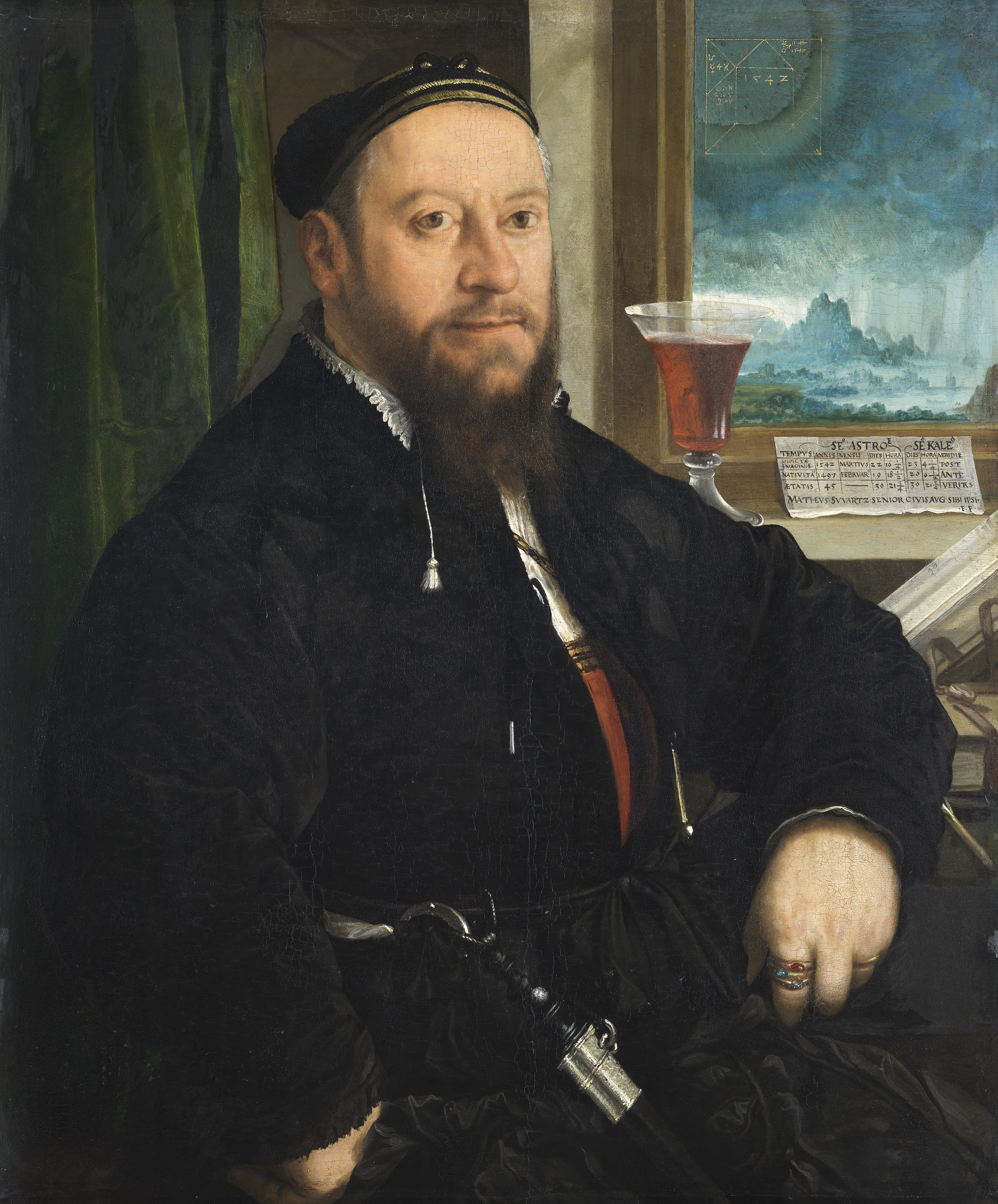
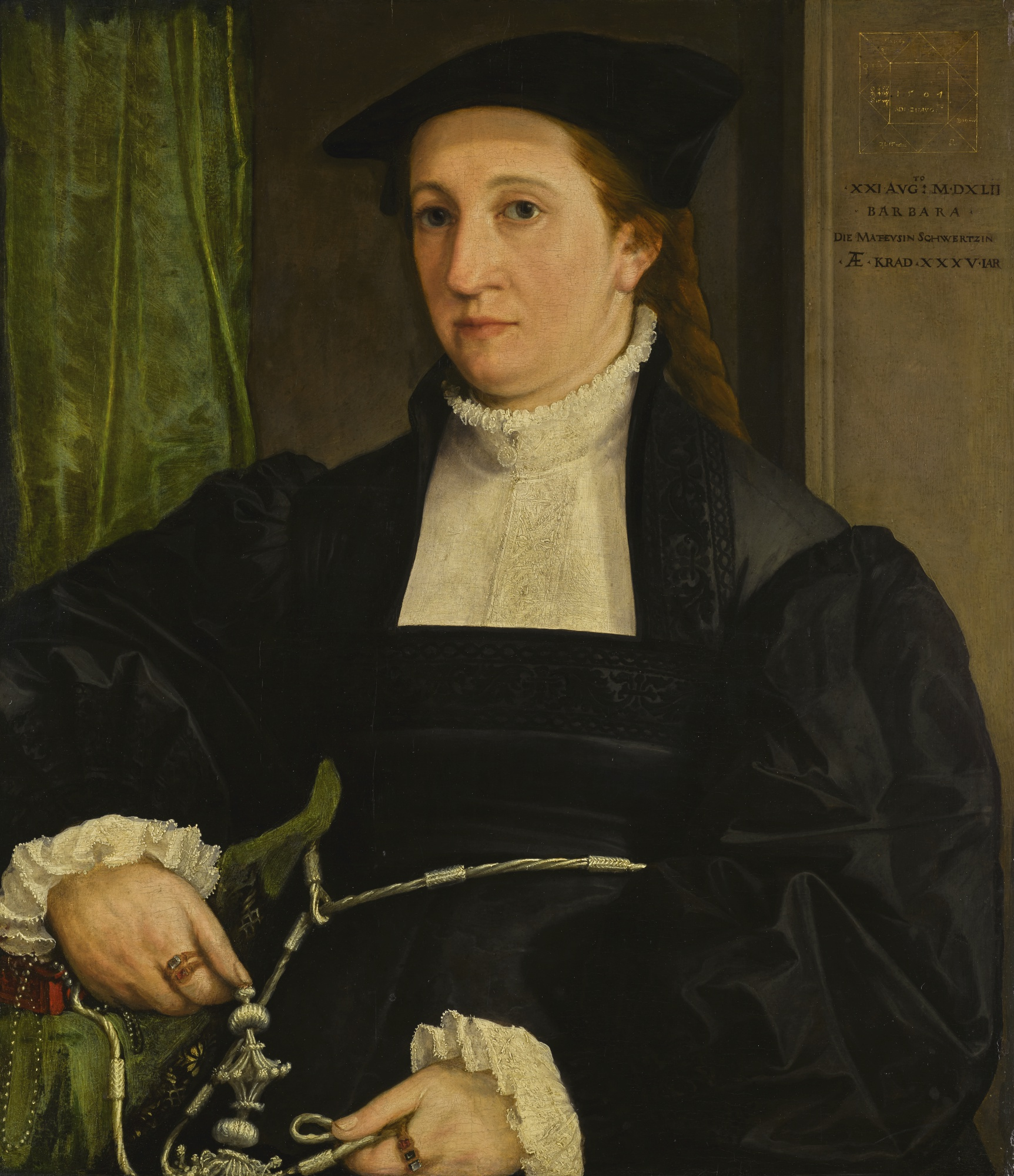
Matthäus and Barbara Schwarz by Christoph Amberger, 1542

He married Barbara Mangold in 1538. A pair of portraits of Schwarz and his wife in 1542 by Christoph Amberger are held by the Thyssen-Bornemisza Museum and the Kisters Collection respectively.

He was ennobled by Charles V, Holy Roman Emperor in 1541, and died in Augsburg circa 1574.

== Bibliography ==
- Braunstein, Philippe (7 December 1992). Un banquier mis a nu : Autobiographie de Matthäus Schwarz, bourgeois d'Augsbourg. Découvertes Gallimard Albums (in French). Paris: Éditions Gallimard. ISBN 2070568571.
- Rublack, Ulinka; Hayward, Maria; Tiramani, Jenny, eds. (22 October 2015). The First Book of Fashion: The Books of Clothes of Matthäus & Veit Konrad Schwarz of Augsburg. London: Bloomsbury Publishing. ISBN 9780857857682.
