= Self-portrait (Giorgione) =

Painting by Giorgione

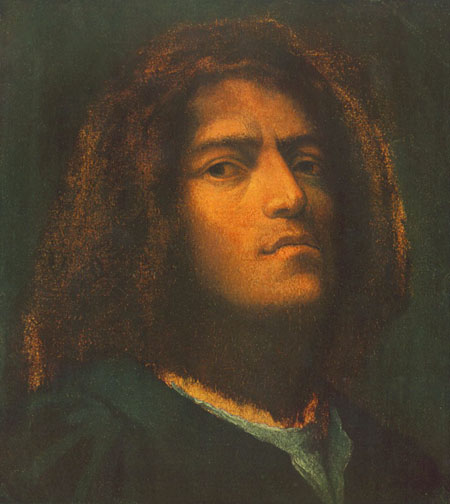
- Artist: Giorgione
- Year: 1508–10
- Type: oil on paper, transferred to canvas
- Dimensions: 31 cm × 28 cm (12 in × 11 in)
- Location: Museum of Fine Arts; Budapest

The Self-portrait of Giorgione is a possible self-portrait by the Italian painter Giorgione, now in the Museum of Fine Arts in Budapest. It is not universally accepted as an autograph work but – if it is – it is thought to be based on the c.1509-1510 Self-portrait as David now in the Herzog Anton Ulrich Museum.

It was stolen on 5 November 1983. It was recovered in Operation Budapest.
