= Jean Humbert =

Jean Humbert may refer to:

- Jean Humbert (painter) (1734–1794), Dutch painter
- Jean Emile Humbert (1771–1839), Dutch military engineer who rediscovered ancient Carthage
- Jean Joseph Amable Humbert (1767–1823), French general
