= Daniel de Superville =

Daniel de Superville may refer to:

- Daniel de Superville (1657-1728), French Calvinist theologian who fled to the Netherlands and became minister of the Walloon church in Rotterdam
- Daniel de Superville (1700-1762), his son; Calvinist theologian who served as minister of the Walloon church in Rotterdam, see Daniel de Superville (1657–1728)
- Daniel de Superville (1696–1773), Dutch physician who founded the University of Erlangen
