= Portrait of a Family =

1668 oil painting by Rembrandt

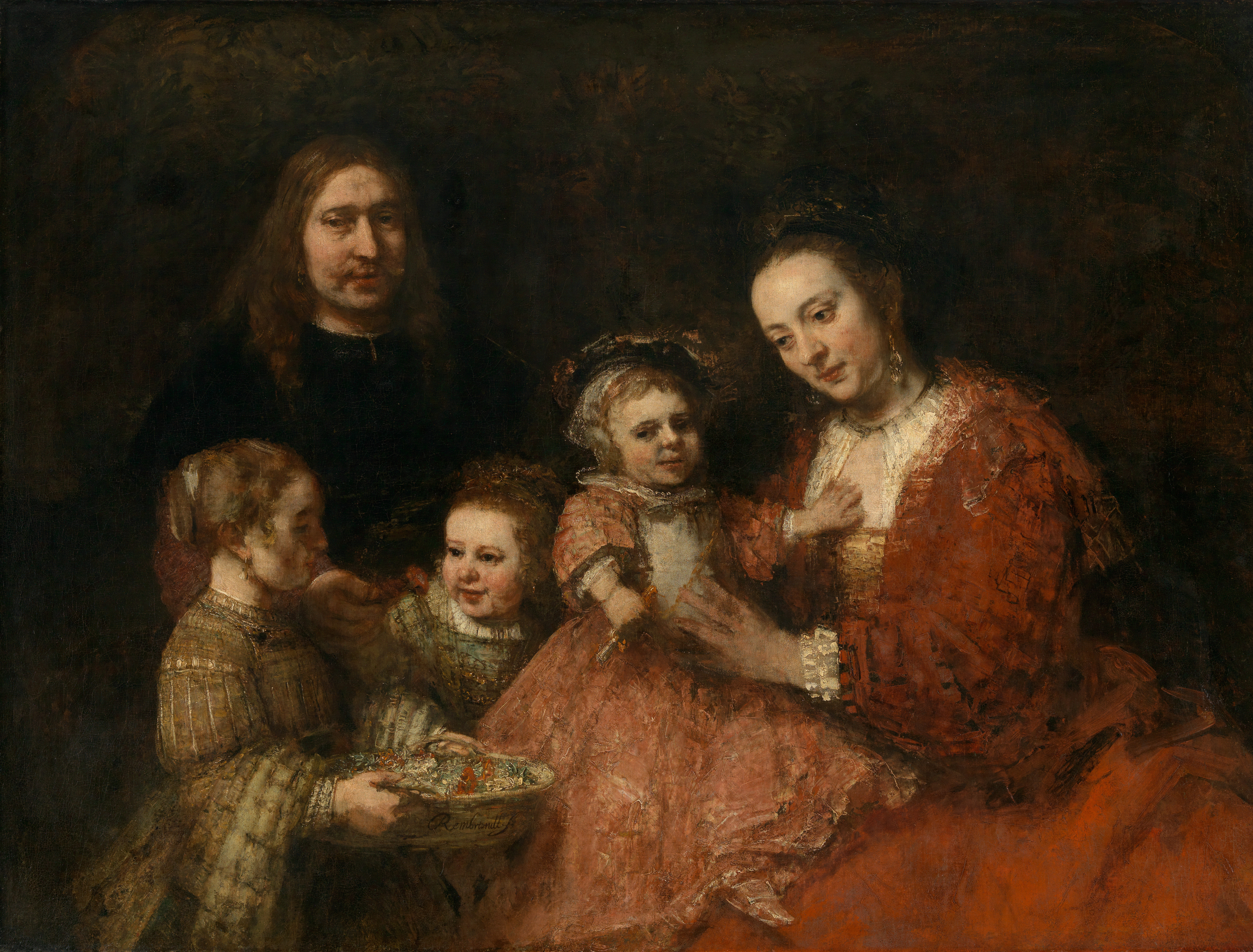

Portrait of a Family or the Brunswick Family Portrait is a 1668 oil on canvas painting by Rembrandt, now in the Herzog Anton Ulrich-Museum in Braunschweig. Its subjects are unidentified.

== Bibliography ==
- Christel Brückner: Rembrandts Braunschweiger Familienbild. Olms, Hildesheim 1998, ISBN 3-487-10244-7 (in German)
- Silke Gatenbröcker: Familienglück – Rembrandt und sein Braunschweiger Meisterwerk. Imhof, Petersberg 2006, ISBN 3-86568-187-5 (in German)
- Doris Guth, Elisabeth Priedl (Hrsg.): Bilder der Liebe: Liebe, Begehren und Geschlechterverhältnisse in der Kunst der Frühen Neuzeit. Transcript Verlag, Bielefeld 2014, S. 139–146, ISBN 978-3-8394-1869-7 (in German)
- Rembrandt und sein Kreis. Bilderhefte des Herzog-Anton-Ulrich-Museums; H. 4. Herzog Anton Ulrich-Museum, Braunschweig 1973 (in German)
- Joseph Eduard Wessely (1889). "Rembrandt van Rijn". Allgemeine Deutsche Biographie (in German). Vol. 28. Leipzig: Duncker & Humblot. pp. 193–197. (in German)
