= Esterhazy Madonna =

Painting by Raphael

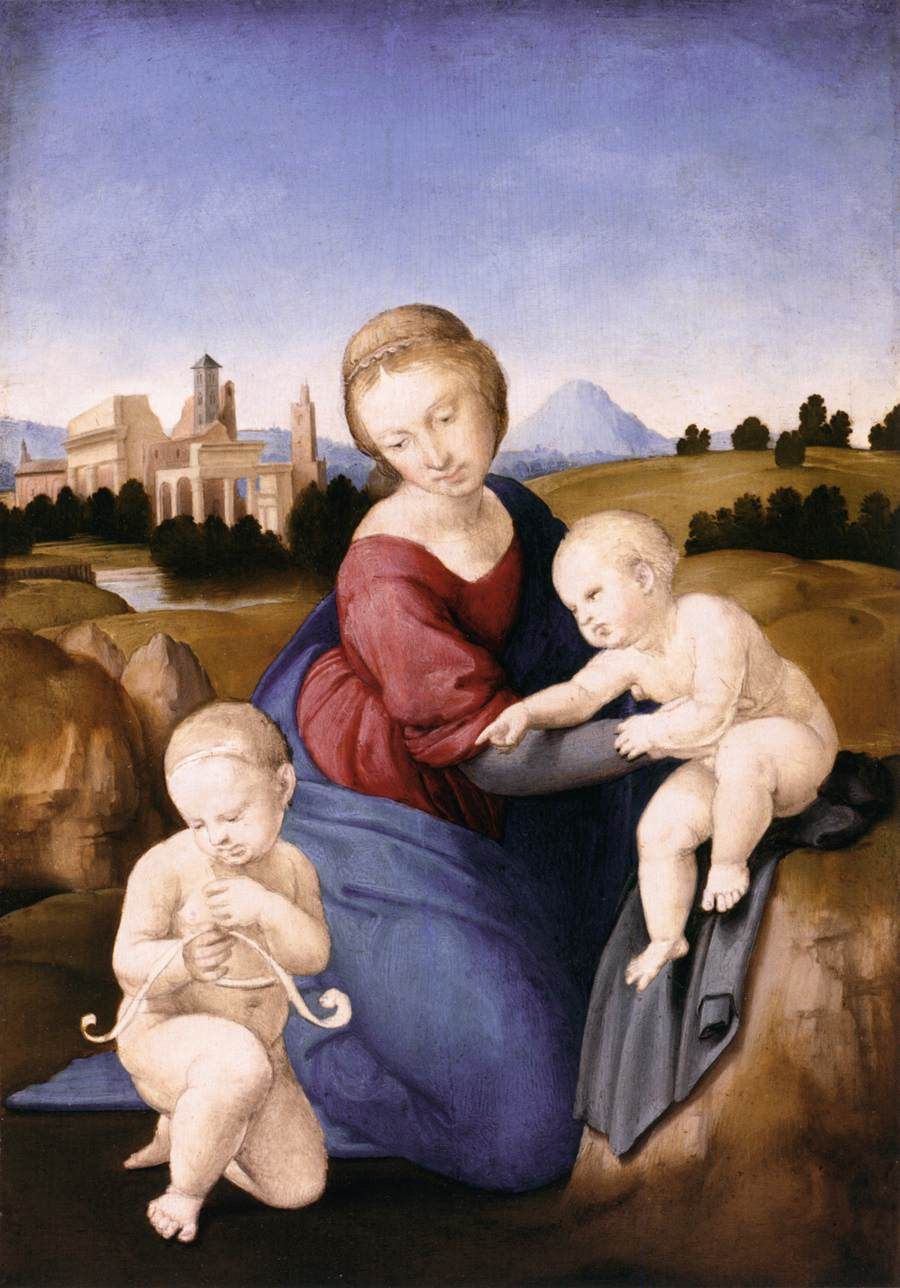
- Artist: Raphael
- Year: c. 1508
- Medium: oil on canvas
- Dimensions: 29 cm × 21.5 cm (11 in × 8.5 in)
- Location: Museum of Fine Arts; Budapest

The Esterhazy Madonna is an oil-on-canvas painting by Raphael, created c. 1508, held at the Museum of Fine Arts in Budapest, in Hungary. It was stolen on the night of 5 November 1983, along with other works by Raphael, Giorgione, Tintoretto and Tiepolo. All the works, including this one, were recovered by the Italian Carabinieri in an abandoned Greek convent near Aigio.

== See also ==
- List of paintings by Raphael
- Operation Budapest

== Bibliography ==
- Comando Carabinieri - TPC, Anno Operativo 2001, Edizioni De Luca, Roma 2001
