= Bartholomäus Zeitblom =

German painter (c. 1450–c. 1519)

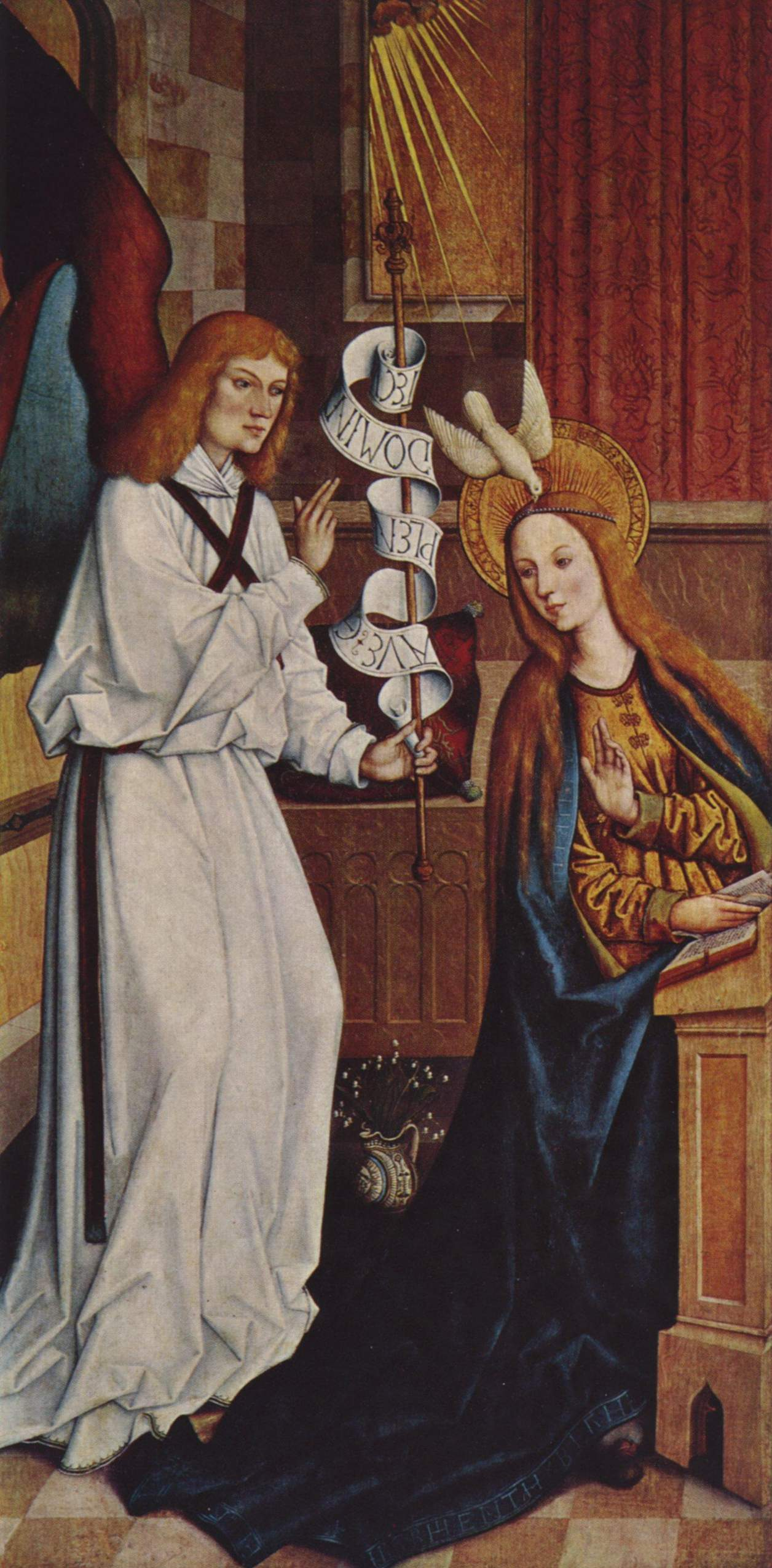
Bartholomäus Zeitblom, The Annunciation

Bartholomäus Zeitblom (c. 1450 – c. 1519) was a German painter, the chief master of the school of Ulm, where he is on official record from 1482 to 1518.

== Biography ==
He was born in Nordlingen and was the pupil and son-in-law of Hans Schüchlein, but, unlike his master, was singularly free from Dutch and Flemish influence. Zeitblom's paintings are distinguished by artistic feeling and clear, cool, delicate color. His single figures are restrained and often beautiful; his treatment of drapery is simple and graceful, but he lacked dramatic power.

His principal works include the altarpiece from the church at Heerberg (1497), and four panels from the Eschach altarpiece (1495), depicting "The Two Saint Johns," the "Annunciation," and "Visitation," all in the Royal Gallery, Stuttgart; the great altarpiece with "Scenes from the Passion" and the "History of St. John the Baptist," in the church at Blaubeuren; four panels with the "Legend of St. Valentine," in the Augsburg Gallery; a "Pietà," in the Germanic Museum at Nuremberg; the "Handkerchief of St. Veronica," in the Berlin Gallery, and "St. Margaret," and "St. Ursula," in the Munich Pinakhotek; the altarpiece featuring an Annunciation in the Louvre.

One of his prominent pupils was the German painter Hans Maler zu Schwaz.

== Gallery ==
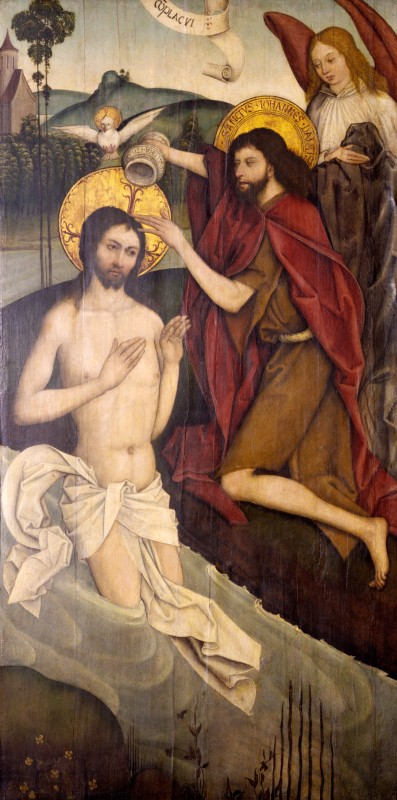
The Baptism of Christ (1495–1500)

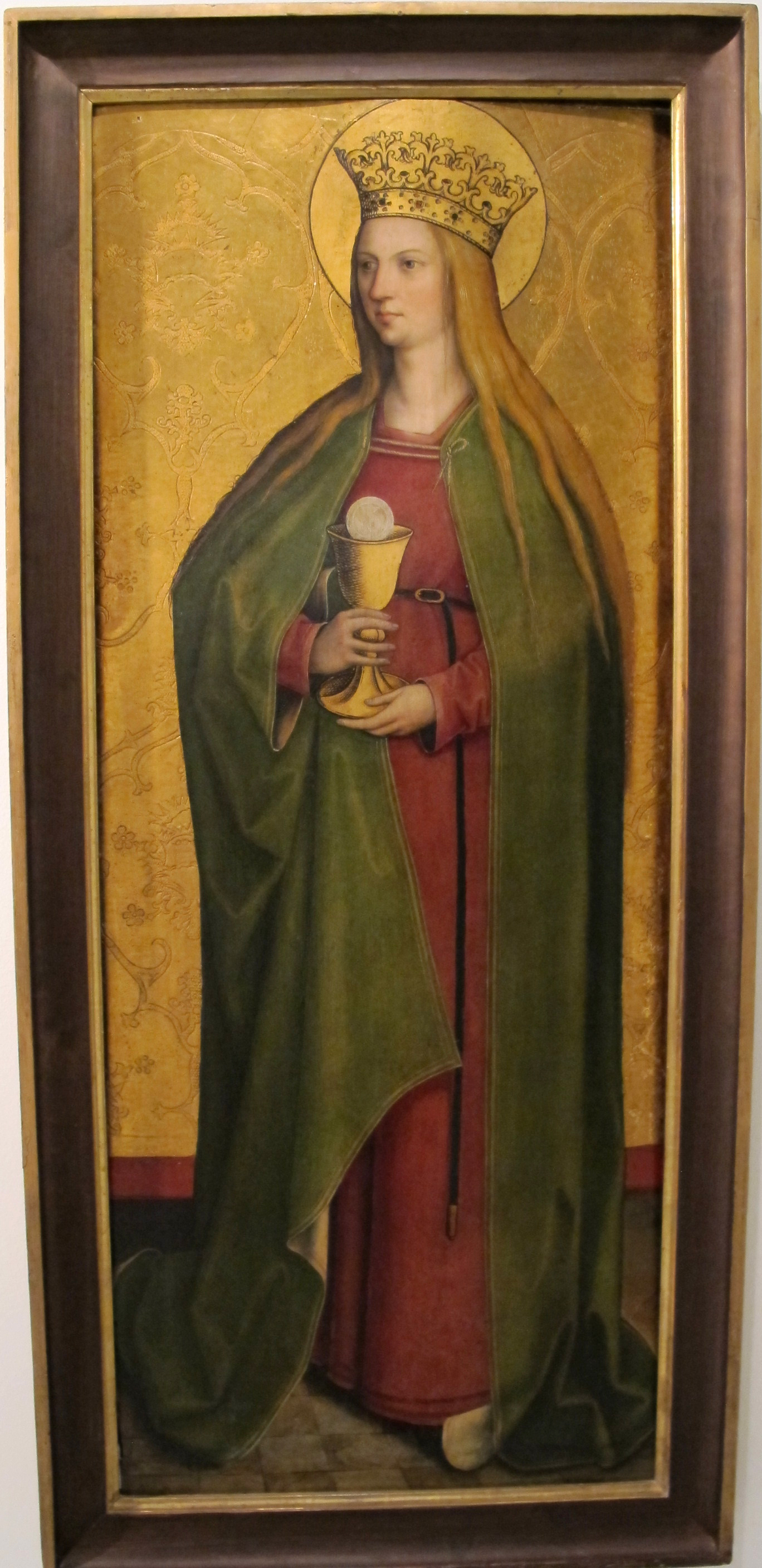
Saint Barbara

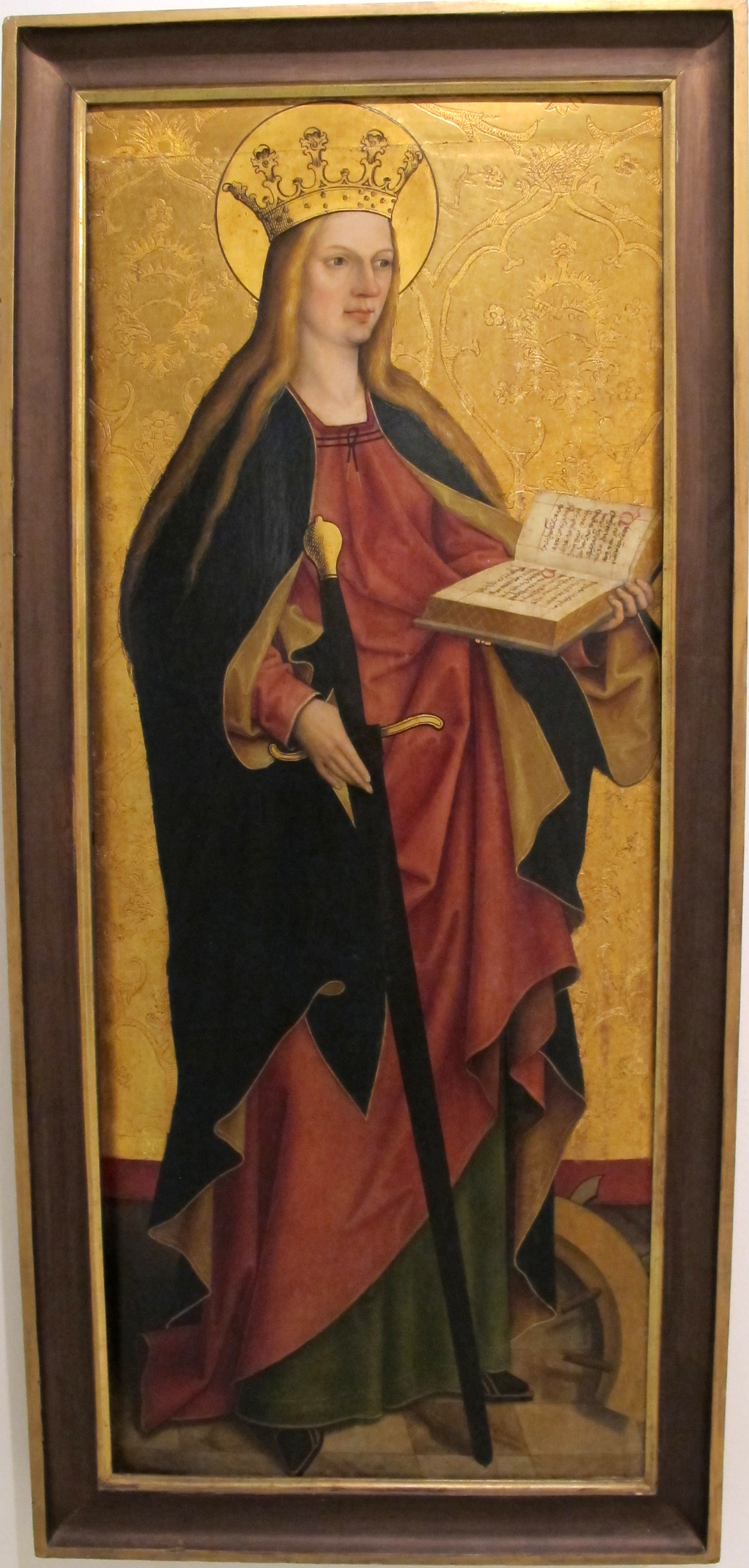
Saint Catherine

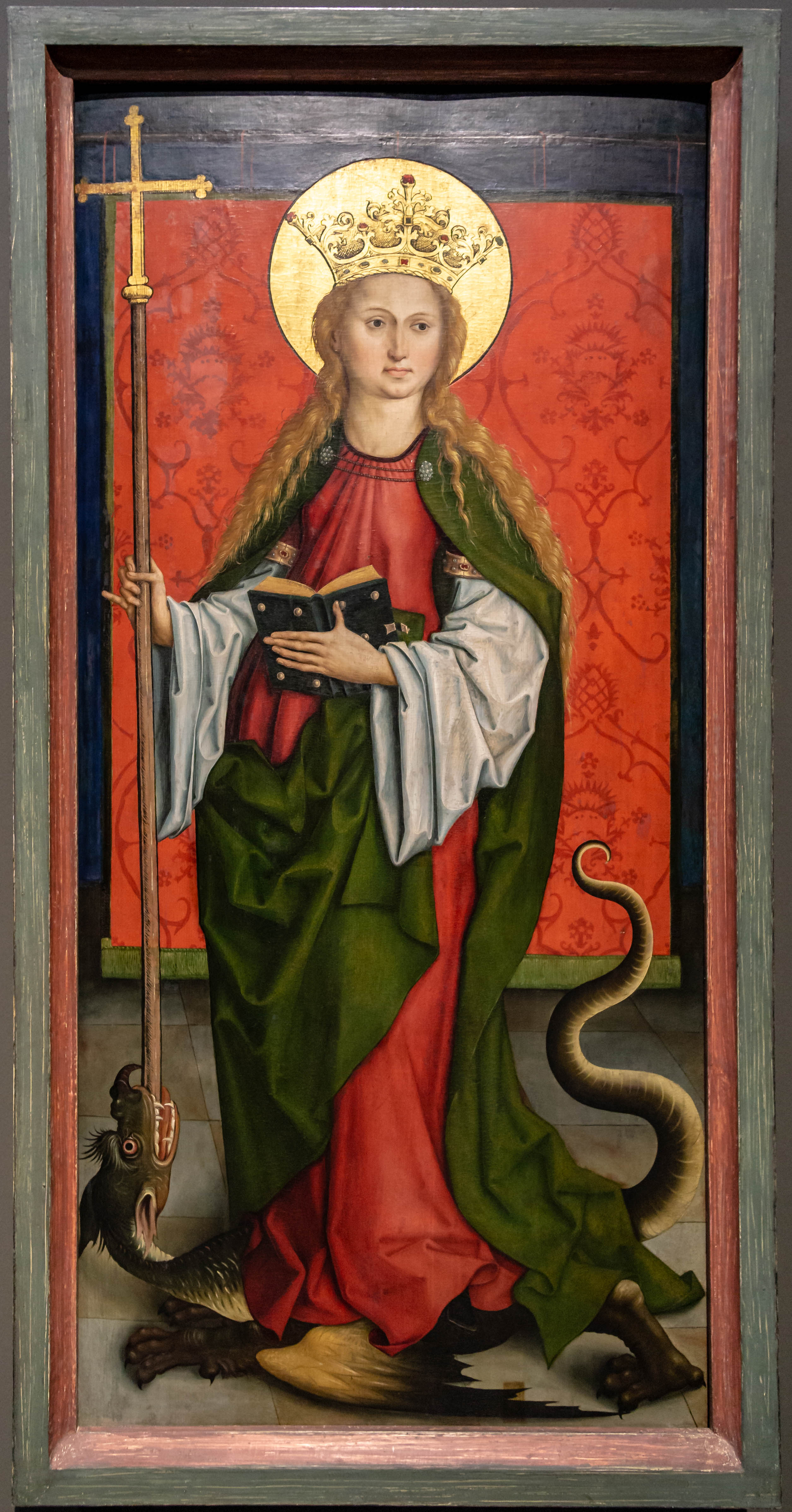
Saint Margaret

== Other projects ==
Media related to Bartholomäus Zeitblom at Wikimedia Commons
