= Mark Duncan (regent) =

- Died: 1640

Mark Duncan (1570?–1640) was a Scottish regent of the University of Saumur.

== Life ==
Duncan was the son of Thomas Duncan of Maxpoffle, Roxburghshire, by Janet, daughter of Patrick Oliphant of Sowdoun in the same county, is supposed to have been born about 1570, and to have been educated partly in Scotland and partly on the continent. He certainly took the degree of M.D., but at what university is not known.

From Duplessis-Mornay, he was appointed governor of Saumur by Henry IV in 1589; he received the post of professor of philosophy in the University of Saumur, of which he subsequently became regent.

Duncan is said to have been versed in mathematics and theology, as well as in philosophy, and to have acquired such a reputation for medical skill that James I offered him the post of physician in ordinary at the English court, and even forwarded to him the necessary patent; but to have declined the royal invitation out of regard to his wife (a French lady), who was reluctant to leave her native land.

Duncan lived at Saumur until his death, which took place in 1640, to the regret, it is said, of Protestants and Catholics alike.

== Works ==
Duncan published in 1612 Institutiones Logicæ, to which Burgersdijck, in the preface to his own Institutiones Logicæ (second edition 1634), acknowledged himself much indebted, and which indeed seems to have served as a model to the latter work; also (anon.) in 1634, Discours de la Possession des Religieuses Ursulines de Loudun, an investigation of the supposed cases of demoniacal possession among the Ursuline nuns of Loudun. The phenomena had been attributed to the sorcery of Urbain Grandier, curé and canon of Loudun, who had been burned at the stake in consequence. Duncan explained them, at much risk to himself, as the result of melancholy. He is said to have been shielded from the vengeance of the clergy only by the influence of the wife of the Maréchal Urbain de Maillé-Brézé, then governor of Saumur.

This work elicited an answer in the shape of a Traité de la Mélancholie by the Sieur de la Menardière, and that in its turn an Apologie pour Mr. Duncan, Docteur en Médecine, dans laquelle les plus rares effects de la Mélancholie et de l'imagination sont expliquez contre les reflexions du Sieur de la M^{re} par le Sieur de la F. M.. La Flèche (no date).

Duncan also wrote a treatise entitled Aglossostomographie on a boy who continued to speak after he had lost his tongue, pronouncing only the letter "r" with difficulty. The faulty Greek of the title, which should have been Aglossostomatographie, was very severely criticised in prose and verse by a rival physician of Saumur, named Benoit.

== Family ==
Mark Duncan married Suzanne Gorin or Gorrin at the Protestant temple in Saumur on 7 January 1611. They had three sons and three daughters who survived childhood.

The three sons were Mark Duncan de Cérisantis; François Duncan, Sieur de Saint Helène, b.1617 in Saumur, d.1697 in London; and Jean or John Duncan, Sieur de Montfort, b.1624 in Samur, entered the service of Queen Christina of Sweden, d.1646 in Stockholm.

The three daughters were Guillonne (1612-1670), Rachel (b.1613) and Claude (1619-c.1684).

After the Revocation of the Edict of Nantes in 1685, Mark and Suzanne's granddaughter Suzanne Martin, daughter of their daughter Rachel, differed in opinion so strongly from her husband Moïse Poitevin, of another large Saumur Protestant family, that they separated: he abjured and stayed in France, but she left c. mid-1688, first to England, where she did her "reconnaissance" at Leicester Fields Huguenot Church, then to Rotterdam where she bore her last-born, Paul Poitevin, in December 1688, whose godfather was Pierre de Monnery, father-in-law of minister and pastor Daniel de Superville.
