= Jacobus Ludovicus Cornet =

Dutch painter (1815–1882)

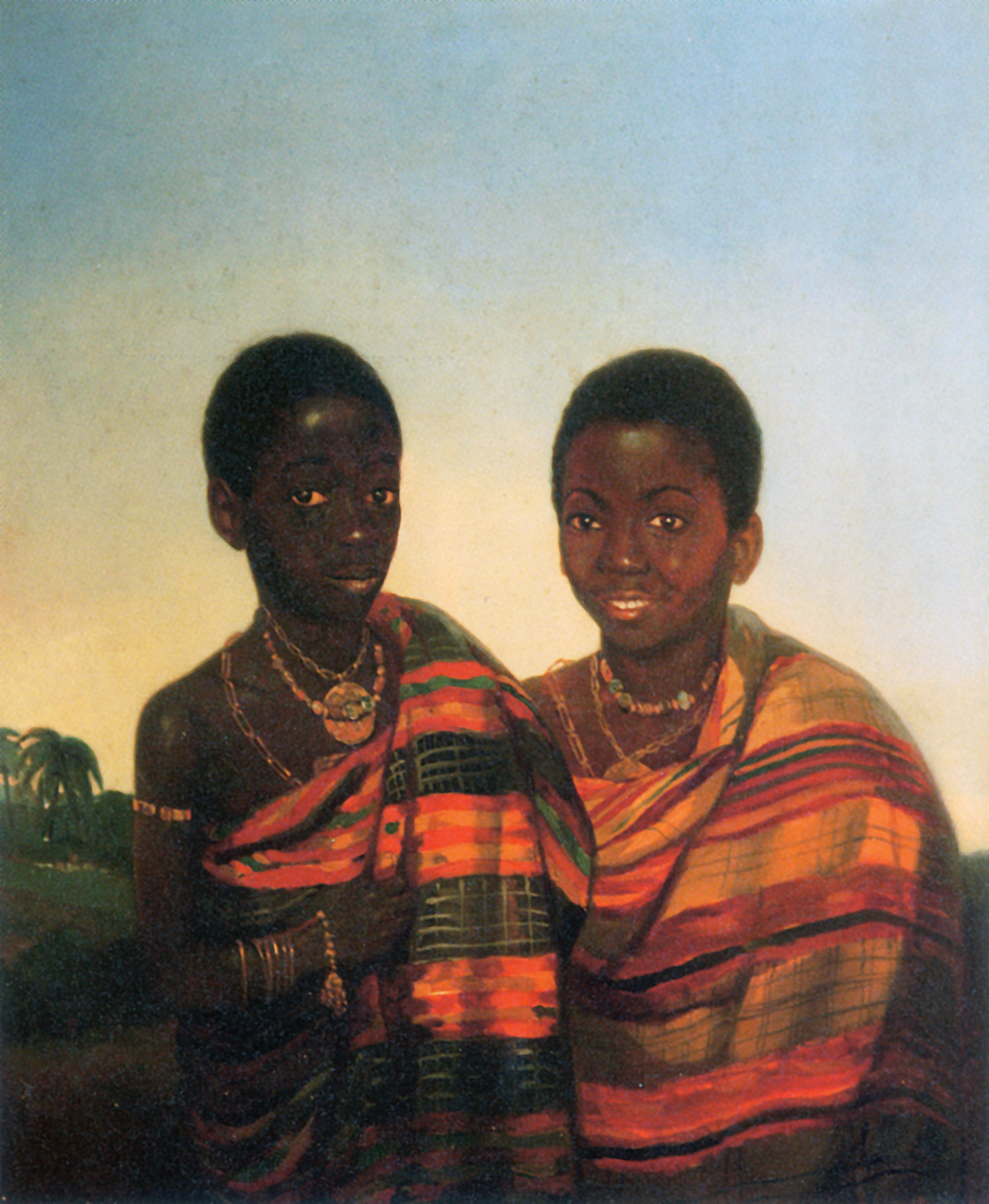
The Ashanti princes Aquasi Boachi and Quamin Poko, c. 1840

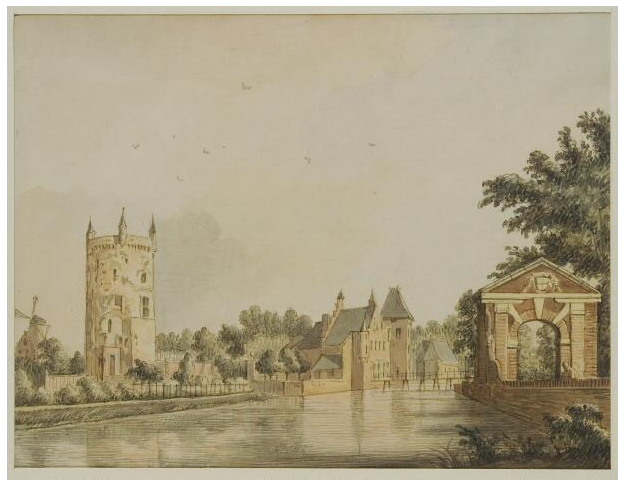
The castle of Culemborg in 1750. This 1872 work by Cornet was based on an original by Jan de Beijer

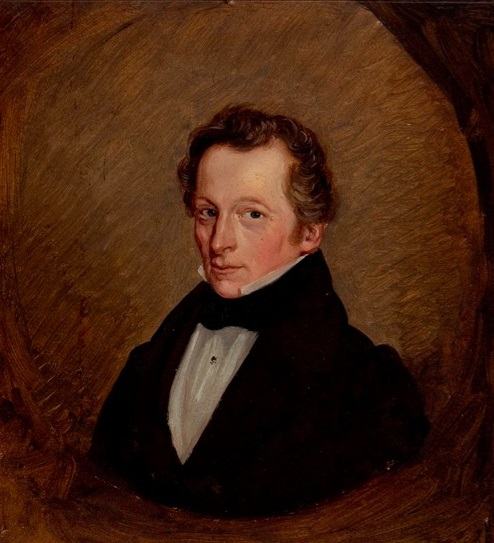
Portrait of J.T. Bodel Nijenhuis by Cornet (Collection Leiden University Library)

Jacobus Ludovicus Cornet (1815, in Leiden – 1882, in Leiden), also known by his initials as J.L. Cornet, was a Dutch painter and draughtsman. He often depicted Dutch historic scenes and figures (particularly from the Dutch Golden Age), contributing several paintings to Jacob de Vos Jacobszoon's gallery of oil paintings depicting scenes from Dutch history. Cornet also painted and drew portraits, landscapes, interiors and a range of other subjects.

He served as head of the Prentenkabinet (cabinet of prints) in Leiden from 1851 to his death in 1882. After his death, no successor was appointed, and large portions of the collection were transferred to the Rijksprentenkabinet, now part of the Rijksmuseum in Amsterdam.

Cornet received instruction in drawing in Leiden but was largely self-taught. He was one of the founders of the Lakenhal museum in Leiden. He was also a director of the Leiden artists' society Ars Aemula Naturae and a member of the Amsterdam artists' society Arti et Amicitiae.

For the painting De kamer van de gebroeders De Witt in de Gevangenpoort na de moord ("The chambre of the brothers de Witt in the Gevangenpoort following the murder"), which Cornet painted for Jacob de Vos Jacobszoon's gallery, he visited the Gevangenpoort prison in The Hague to make an exact reproduction for the painting of the room where Cornelis and Johan de Witt were held before they were dragged from the prison and lynched by an angry mob.

A Cornet painting dating to about 1845, now in the collection of the Lakenhal museum, depicts the 17th-Century painter Paulus Potter. The Rijksmuseum in Amsterdam has an 1848 portrait by Cornet of the painter David Pierre Giottino Humbert de Superville. In 1982, the Lakenhal museum held an exhibition of works by Cornet.
