= Operation Budapest =

Operation Budapest was a joint investigation between the Italian Carabinieri, the Hungarian police and the Greek police.

On 5 November 1983 the following works were stolen from the Museum of Fine Arts in Budapest

- Self-portrait, Giorgione
- Esterhazy Madonna, Raffaello Sanzio
- Portrait of a Gentleman, Tintoretto
- Portrait of a Gentlewoman, Tintoretto
- Madonna and Saints, Giambattista Tiepolo
- Rest on the Flight into Egypt, Giambattista Tiepolo

They were all recovered in the sacred shrine of Panagia Trypiti in Aigio, Greece.

== Bibliography ==
- Comando Carabinieri - TPC, Anno Operativo 2001, Edizioni De Luca, Roma 2001

== Filmography ==
- Operation Budapest - A crime of art, 2019, documentary directed by Gilberto Martinelli.
