= Self-portrait as David =

Painting by Giorgione

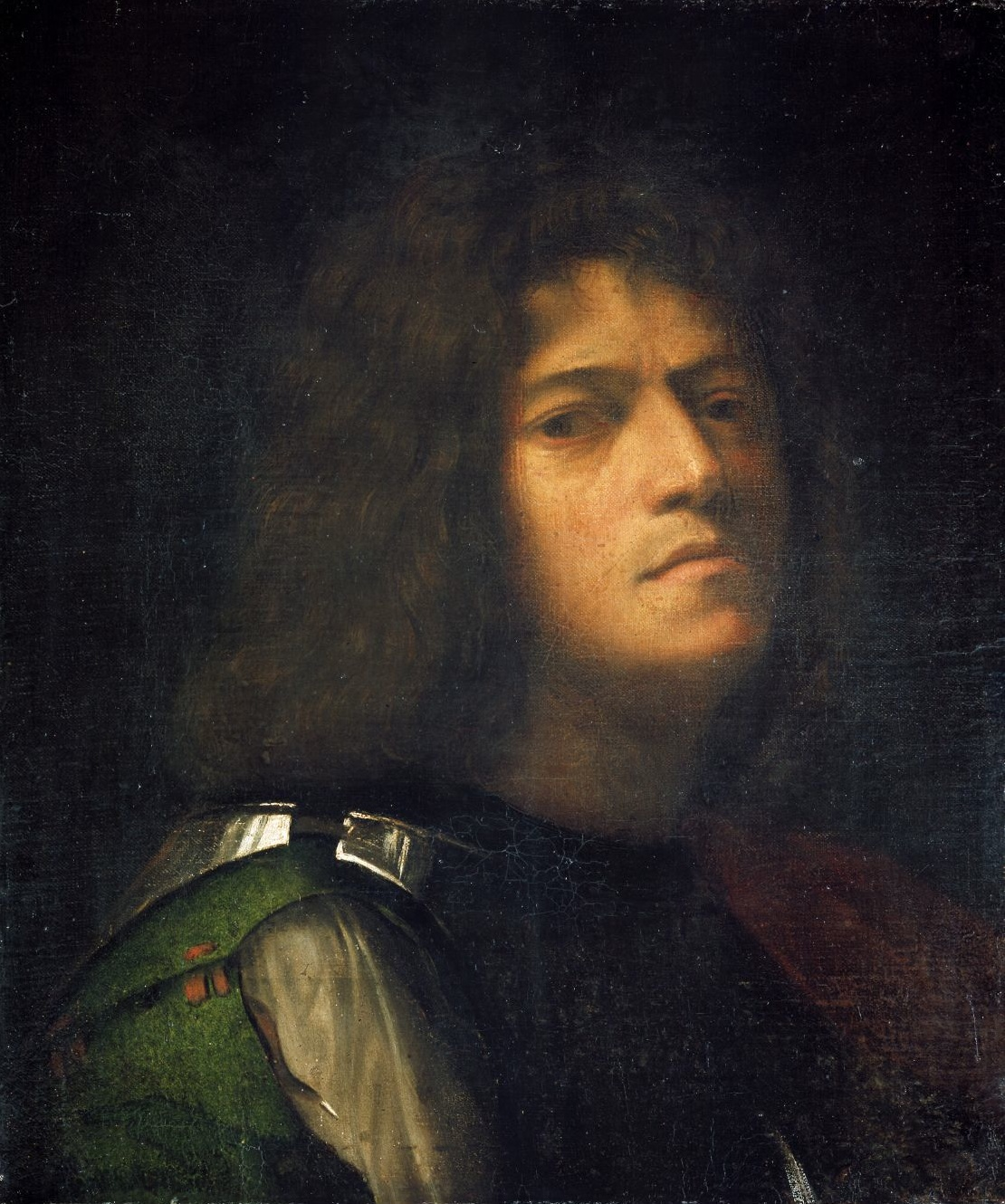
Self-portrait as David (c. 1509–1510) attributed to Giorgione

Self-Portrait as David is an oil-on-panel portrait executed c.1509–1510 by Giorgione, now in the Herzog Anton Ulrich Museum in Brunswick. It is not universally accepted as an autograph work but – if it is – it is thought to be the prototype for another Self-Portrait (Budapest Museum of Fine Arts) by the artist himself or an assistant.

It is mentioned in an inventory of the Casa Grimani dating to 1528 and was seen by Vasari, who mentioned the subject as holding Goliath's head and used it was the basis for the printed portrait of Giorgione in the second edition of his Lives of the Artists in 1568.
