= Hans Maler zu Schwaz =

German painter (1480/88–1526/29)

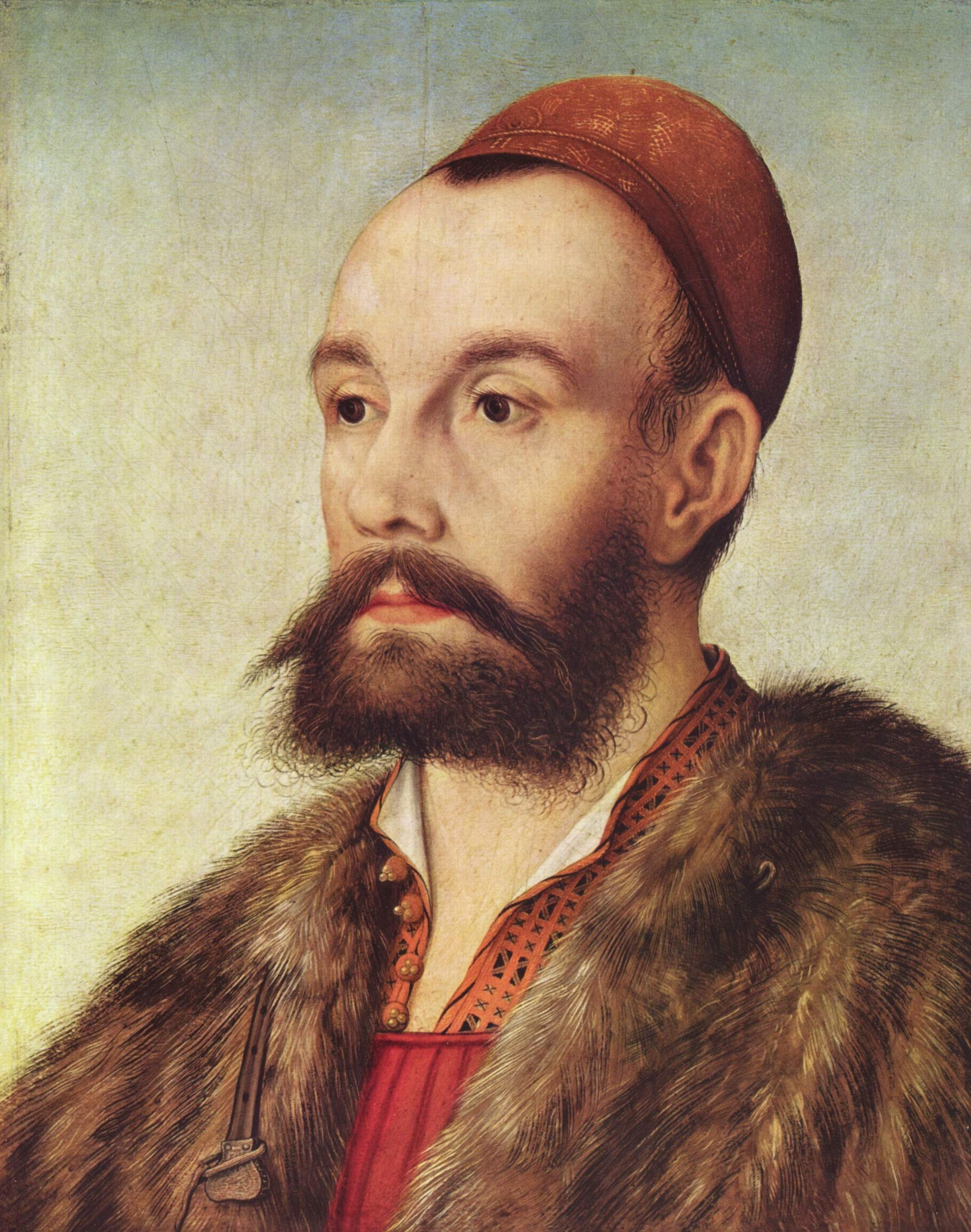
Portrait of Anton Fugger, by Maler

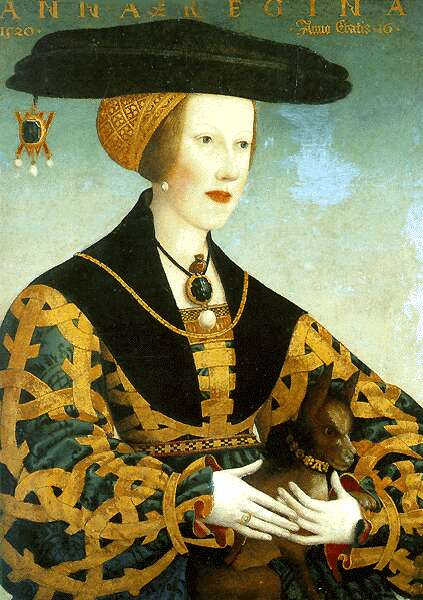
Portrait of Queen Anne of Hungary, by Maler

Hans Maler zu Schwaz (1480/88 – 1526/29) was a German painter born in Ulm and active as portraitist in the village of Schwaz, near Innsbruck. Maler may have trained with the German artist Bartholomäus Zeitblom, who was chief master of the School of Ulm between 1484 and 1517. He painted numerous portraits of members of the Habsburg court at Innsbruck as well as of wealthy merchants such as the Fuggers.

Maler's two most important patrons were Ferdinand I of Austria, who at the time was Archduke (later Emperor), and the celebrated Fuggers. Ferdinand is known to have commissioned at least three portraits of himself and four of his wife, Anna of Bohemia and Hungary. Maler also painted portraits in 1517 of Sebastian Andorfer, a successful metal maker and merchant from Schwaz. His portrait style rarely varied from his bust format, where the subject's hands were not shown and without eye contact to the viewer.

He received commissions early on in his career from Ferdinand's grandfather, Maximilian I, and was also commissioned in 1508 for frescoes depicting the Habsburg family tree in Ambras Castle.

== Selected works ==
- 1510 – Portrait of Mary of Burgundy (Vienna)
- 1515 – Christ Bearing the Cross (Art Institute of Chicago, Chicago)
- 1517 – Portrait of Sebastian Andorfer (Metropolitan Museum of Art, New York)
- 1519 – Portrait of Anne of Hungary and Bohemia (Museo Thyssen-Bornemisza, Madrid)
- 1520 – Portrait of Queen Anne of Hungary (Museo Thyssen-Bornemisza, Madrid)
- 1521 – Portrait of A Beardless Man (Kunsthistorisches Museum, Vienna), was depicted on the obverse of 1965–1995 series of 500-German-mark banknote
- 1523 – Portrait of A Young Man (Private Collection)
- 1524 – Portrait of Ferdinand of Castille (Uffizi Gallery, Florence)
- 1524 – Portrait of Anton Fugger (Decín Castle, Czech Republic)
- 1525 – Portrait du banquier Anton Fugger (Musée des Beaux-Arts de Bordeaux, France)
- 1525 – Portrait of Anton Fugger (Allentown Art Museum, Pennsylvania)
- 1525 – Portrait of Ulrich Fugger (Metropolitan Museum of Art, New York)
- 1526 – Portrait of Matthäus Schwarz (Musée du Louvre, Paris)
