= Christoph Amberger =

German painter (c. 1505–1562)

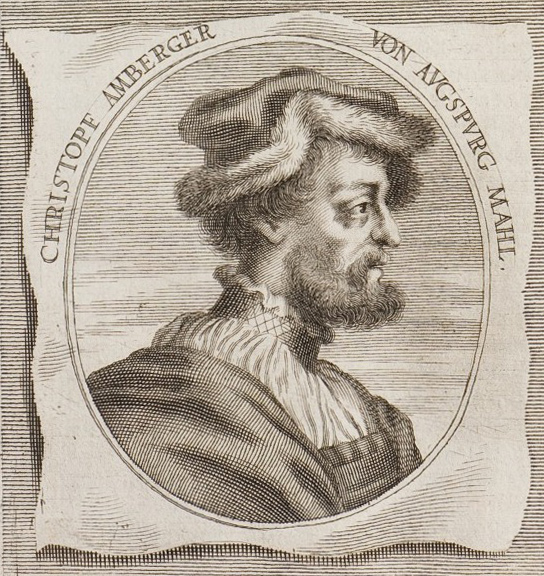
Christoph Amberger as portrayed by Philipp Kilian for Joachim von Sandrart in 1675

Christoph Amberger (c. 1505 – 1562) was a painter of Augsburg in the sixteenth century, a disciple of Hans Holbein, his principal work being the history of Joseph in twelve pictures.

== Life ==
His father was a stonemason and his grandfather a wood-carver at Amberg. Amberger painted in oils and he also did frescos. His oil paintings are mainly portraits, similar in style to Holbein.

Amberger used to visit Augsburg every year where men of power gathered and opportunities for commissions presented themselves. Among those whose portraits he painted were Jakob Fugger, Konrad Peutinger, Georg von Frundsberg and the Emperor Charles V. He travelled to Northern Italy and Venice between 1525 and 1527. He died in Augsburg.

== See also ==
- List of German painters

== Sources ==
- Lexikon över äldre konst, Raben & Sjögrens, 1959, Stockholm Sweden

== Bibliography ==
- Wilhelm Schmidt (1875). "Ambereger, Christoph" . Allgemeine Deutsche Biographie (in German). Vol. 1. Leipzig: Duncker & Humblot. p. 390.
- Ernst Haasler (1894), Der Maler Christoff Amberger von Augsburg (Dissertation Universität Heidelberg), Königsberg: Hartungsche Buchdruckerei
- Margarete Braun-Ronsdorf (1953). "Amberger, Christoph". Neue Deutsche Biographie (in German). Vol. 1. Berlin: Duncker & Humblot. pp. 241–242. (full text online).
- Neithard Bulst, Thomas Lüttenberg, Andreas Priever: Abbild oder Wunschbild? Bildnisse Christoph Ambergers im Spannungsfeld von Rechtsnorm und gesellschaftlichem Anspruch. In: Saeculum 53 (2002), H. 1, S. 21–73.
- Annette Kranz (2004), Christoph Amberger – Bildnismaler zu Augsburg. Städtische Eliten im Spiegel ihrer Porträts (Dissertation Universität Bonn, 2000), Regensburg: Schnell & Steiner, ISBN 978-3-7954-1628-7
- Annette Kranz (2014), "Christoph Amberger 1500/05–1562: Maler", in Schwäbische Forschungsgemeinschaft (ed.), Lebensbilder aus dem bayerischen Schwaben, vol. 18, Deinigen: Steinmeier, pp. 147–181, ISBN 978-3-943599-35-0
- Kurt Löcher (1979), "Christoph Amberger als Zeichner", Münchner Jahrbuch der bildenden Kunst, vol. 3, no. 30, München: Prestel, pp. 42–80, ISSN 0077-1899
- Kurt Löcher (1981), "Christoph Amberger", Welt im Umbruch. Augsburg zwischen Renaissance und Barock, vol. 3, Augsburg, pp. 134–150
- (in German) Kurt Löcher: Amberger, Christoph. In: Allgemeines Künstlerlexikon. Die Bildenden Künstler aller Zeiten und Völker (AKL). Band 3, Seemann, Leipzig 1990, ISBN 3-363-00116-9, S. 122–125
