= Herzog Anton Ulrich Museum =

Coordinates: 52°15′48″N 10°31′59″E

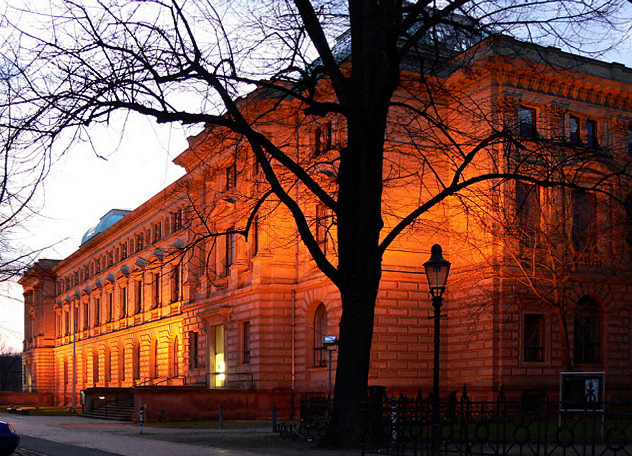
- Herzog Anton Ulrich Museum
- Established: 1754
- Location: Braunschweig, Germany
- Type: Art museum
- Architect: Oskar Sommer
- Owner: Niedersächsische Landesmuseen Braunschweig
- Website: Official website

The Herzog Anton Ulrich Museum (HAUM) is an art museum in the German city of Braunschweig, Lower Saxony.

== History ==
Founded in 1754, the Herzog Anton Ulrich Museum is one of the oldest museums in Europe. The museum has its origins in the art and natural history cabinet of Charles I, Duke of Brunswick-Wolfenbüttel, which he opened in 1754 at the suggestion of the Dutch physician Daniel de Superville. It was one of the first museums in Germany to open to the public and was opened only one year after the British Museum in London. This "cabinet" included a collection of handicraft works and sculptures from the Baroque and Renaissance, but also ancient works of art from outside Europe. The natural history collection later became the basis of the State Natural History Museum.

The current museum building was opened in 1887. Its architect, Oskar Sommer, planned the building in Italian Renaissance style. In 2010 an extension building was added to the museum. The historical building was closed for renovation for seven years. The museum reopened on 23 October 2016.

== Collection ==
The museum houses an important collection of Western old master paintings, and is especially strong in Northern European art since the Renaissance, including works by Lucas Cranach the Elder (a very strong collection), Hans Holbein the Younger, Albrecht Dürer, Anthony van Dyck, Peter Paul Rubens, and Rembrandt. Rarities include a single work each by Vermeer, Giorgione and Rosso Fiorentino. The museum is based on the Schloss Salzdahlum art collection of Anthony Ulrich, Duke of Brunswick-Lüneburg (1633–1714), after whom it is named. In old catalogs, the term Bilder-Galerie zu Salzthalen refers to this collection.

The print room, with over 100,000 prints and 10,000 drawings, is of international importance. There are also temporary exhibitions of art from all over the world. Among the manuscript items is the journal of Matthäus Schwarz, an accountant very interested in fashion who documented his outfits throughout his adult life at a time when it was thought that people not of the highest rank dressed drably. It is the first known fashion book.

The museum's collection of medieval objects is housed at Dankwarderode Castle.

== Provenance Research ==
The museum launched a project to research artworks acquired in the 1940s from the art dealer H. W. Lange in Berlin, Heinrich Hahn in Frankfurt am Main and Scheuermann und Seifert in Berlin. As a result of this research, a painting by Rombout van Troyen, "Felsgrotte mit Opferszene" was restituted to the heirs of the Jewish physician Hans Herxheimer from Frankfurt am Main (Frankfurt 1880-1944 Theresienstadt) and a painting by Max Joseph Wagenbauer, "Großes Bauerngehöft am Dorfrand" (Great Farm with a Village in the far Distance) was the object of a financial settlement. Both paintings were purchased from the Hahn auction of November 17–18, 1942

== Selected works in the museum ==
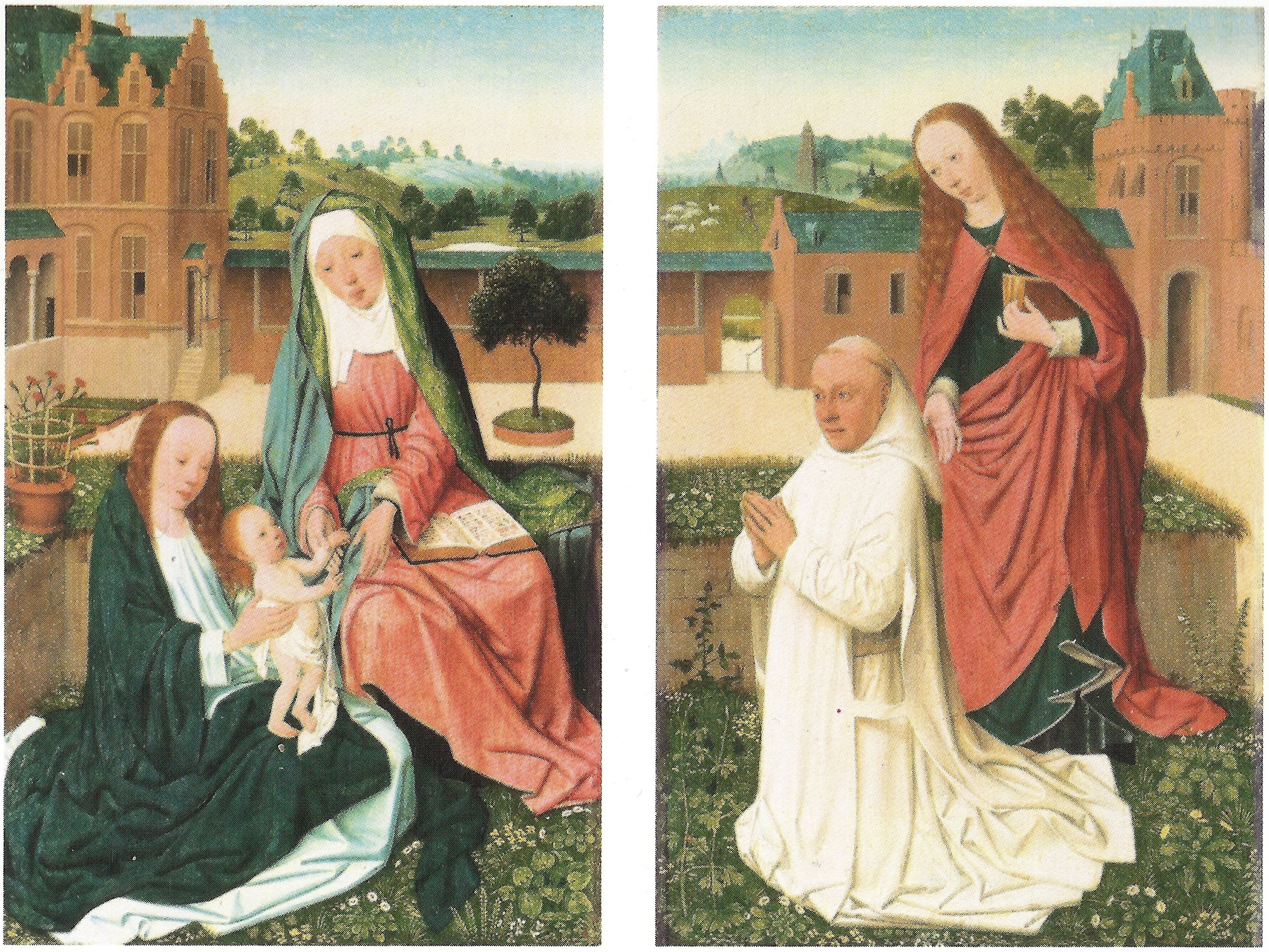
Brunswick Diptych, by the Master of the Brunswick Diptych, c. 1490

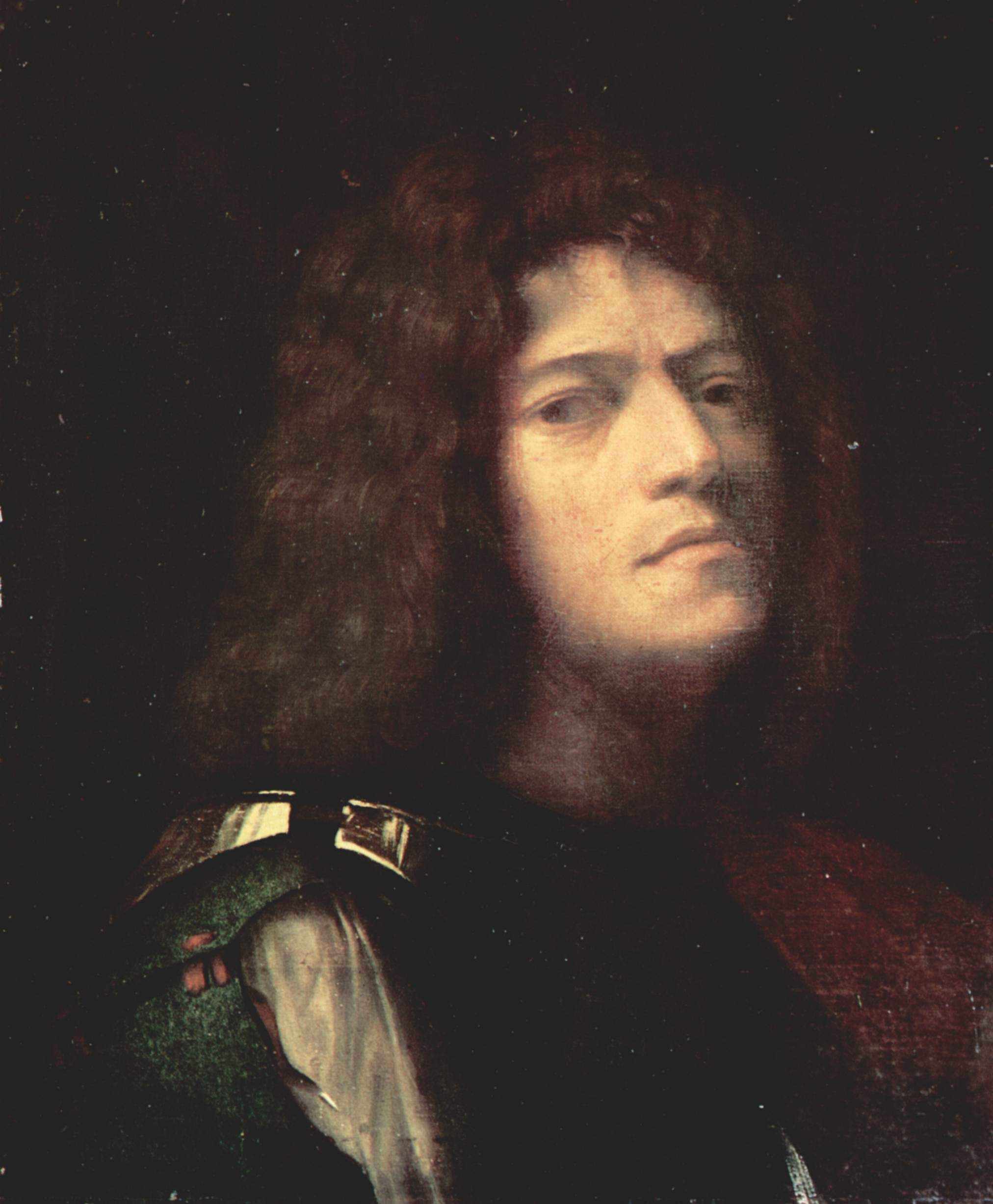
Self-portrait as David, by Giorgione, c. 1500

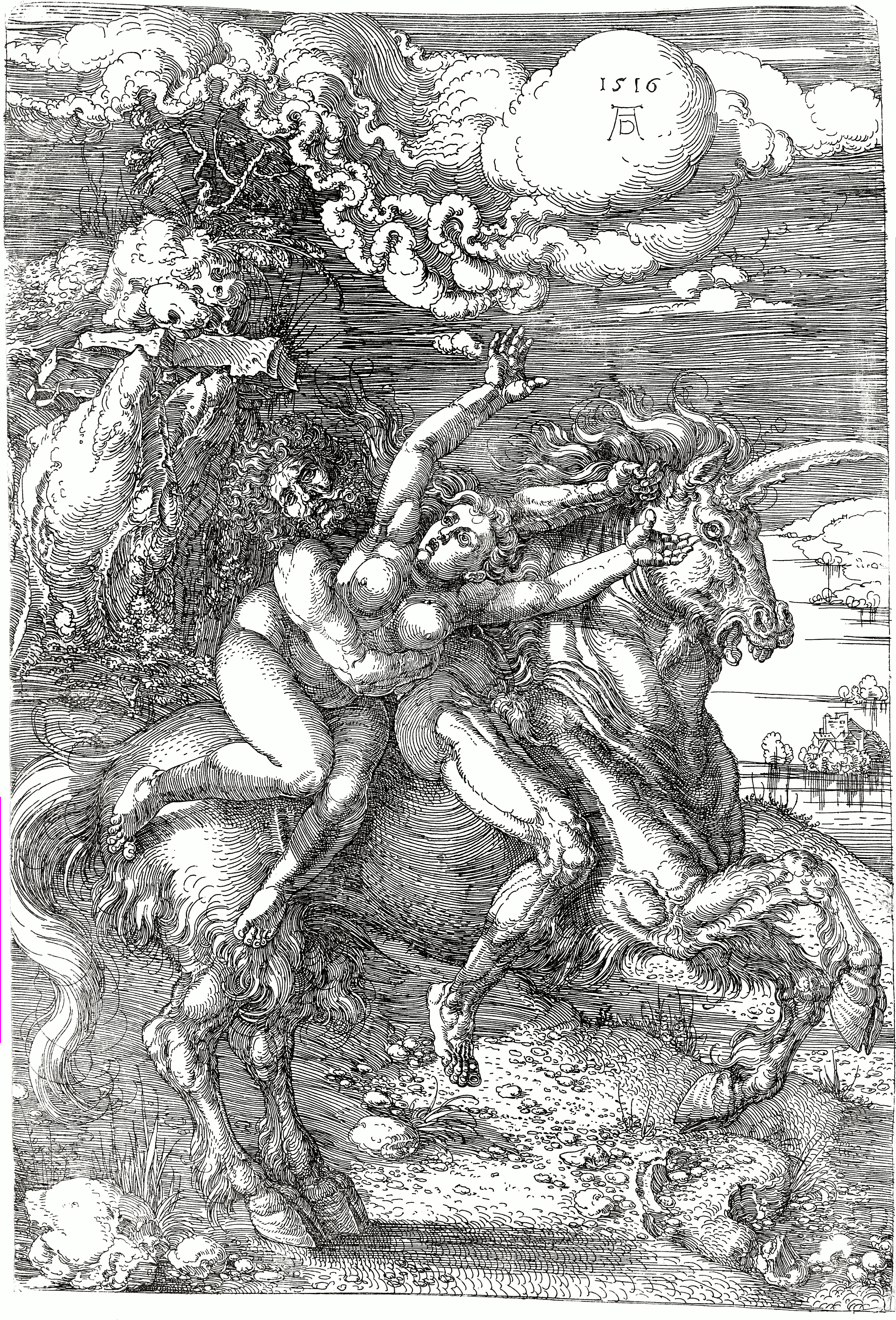
Abduction of Proserpine on a Unicorn, etching by Albrecht Dürer, 1516

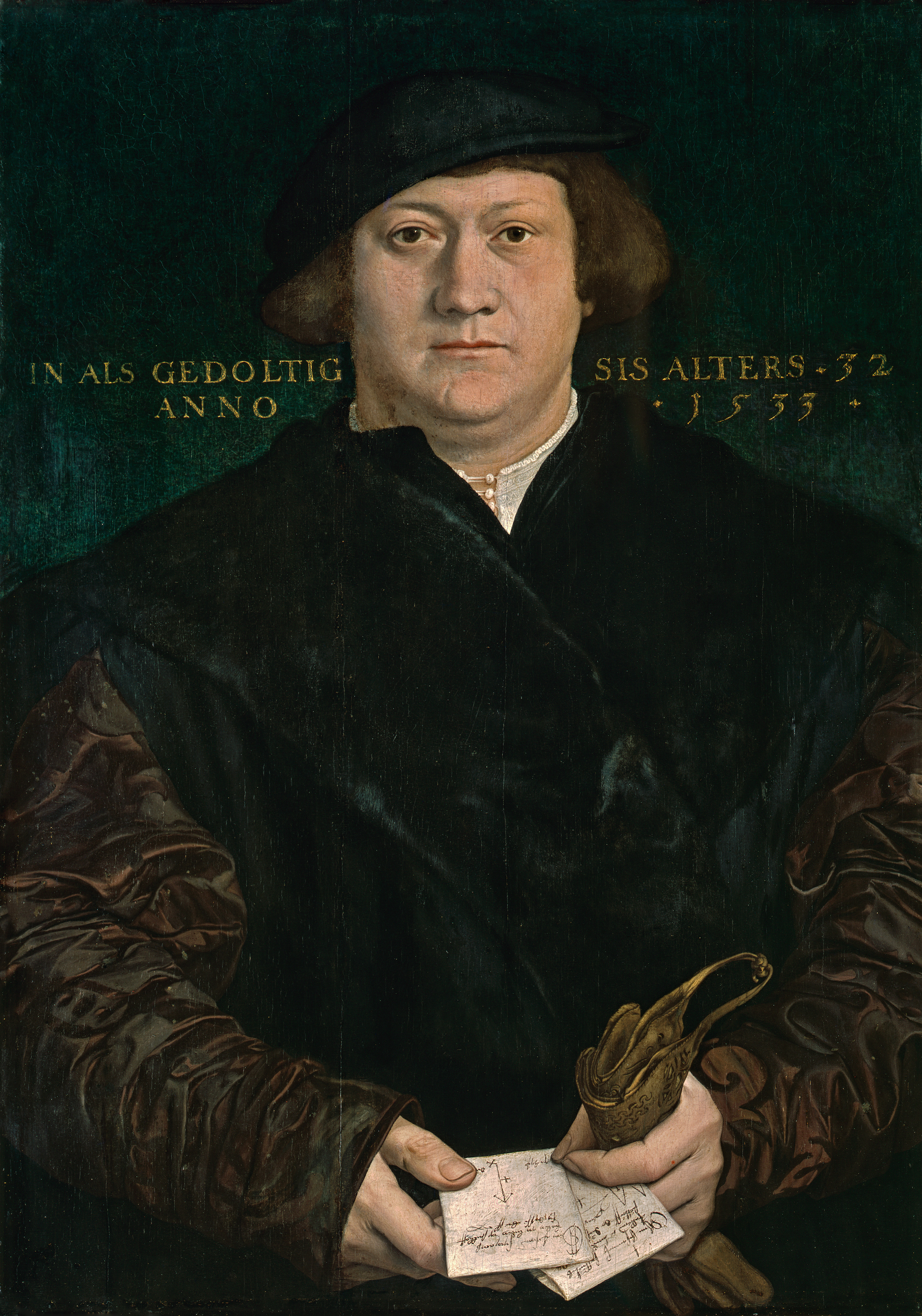
Portrait of Cyriacus Kale, by Hans Holbein the Younger, 1533

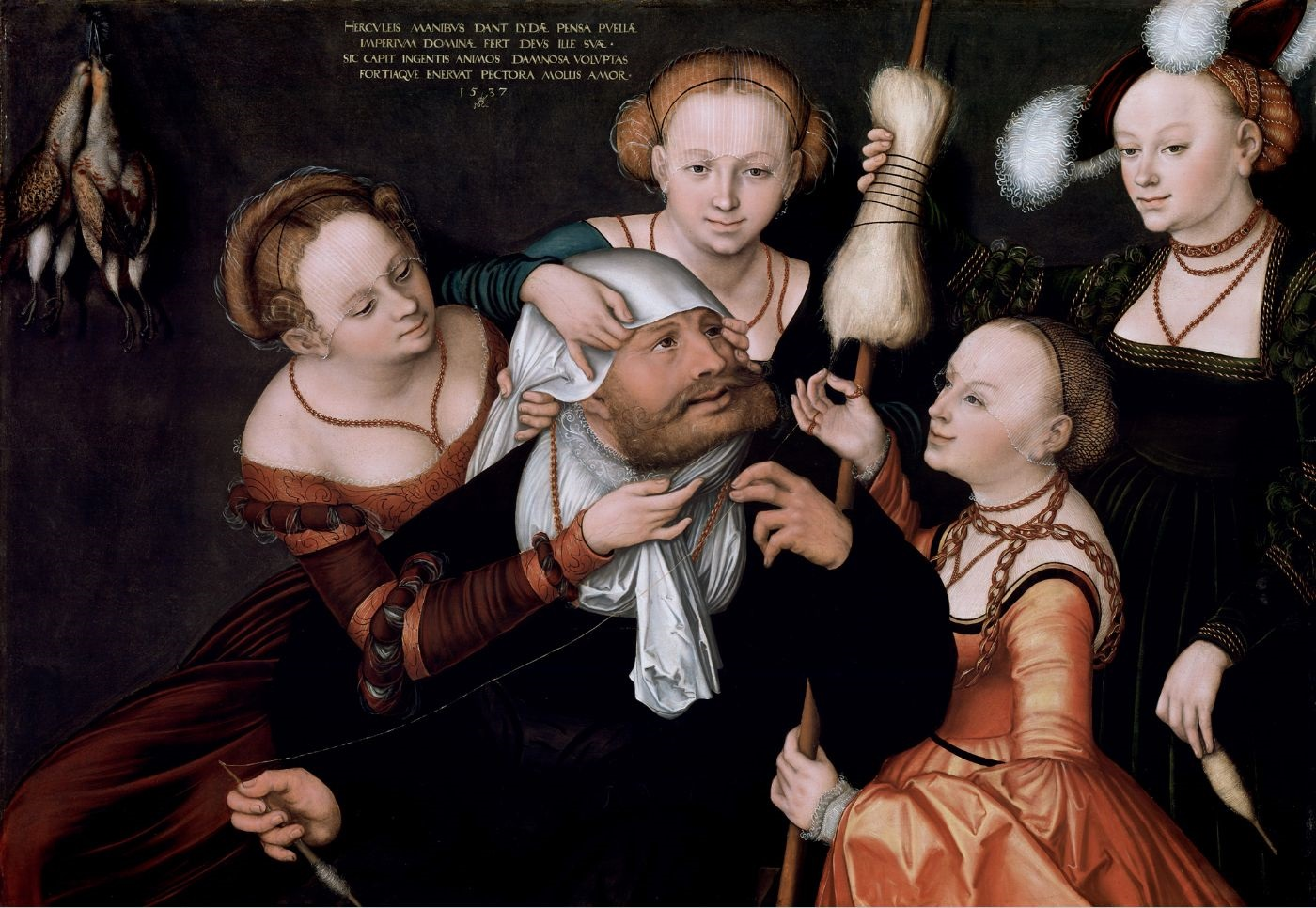
Hercules and Omphale, by Lucas Cranach the Elder, 1537

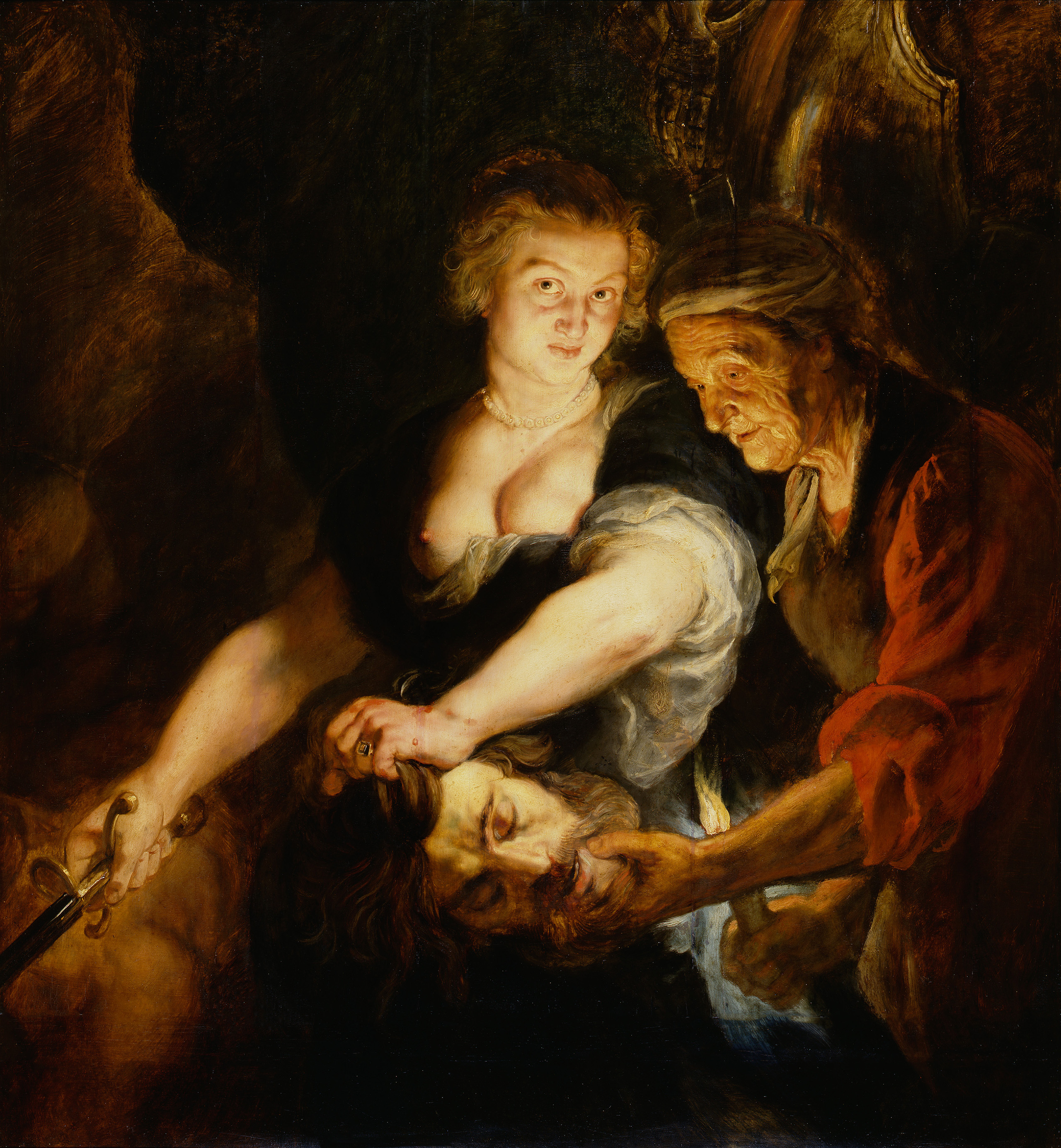
Judith with the Head of Holofernes, by Peter Paul Rubens, 1616

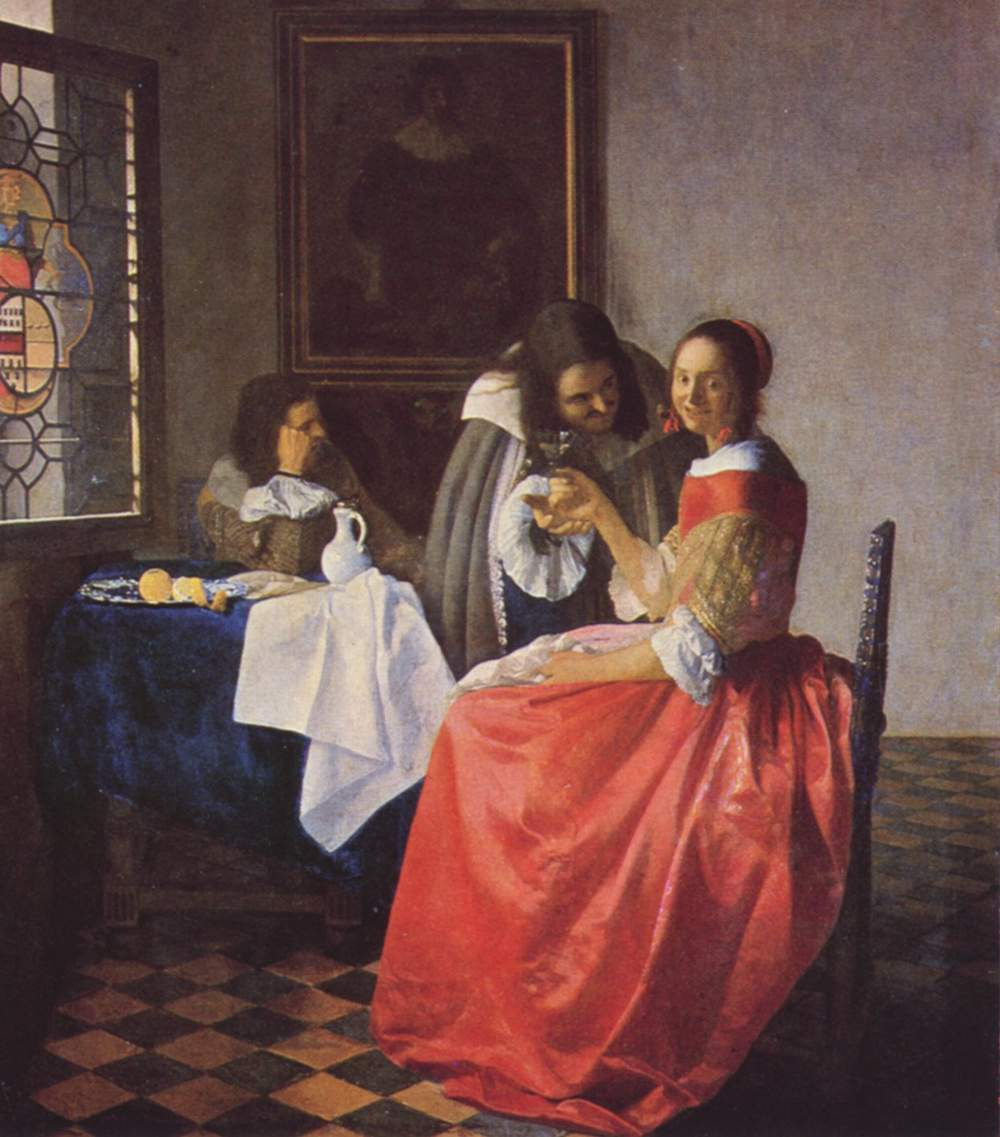
The Girl with the Wine Glass, by Johannes Vermeer, c. 1659

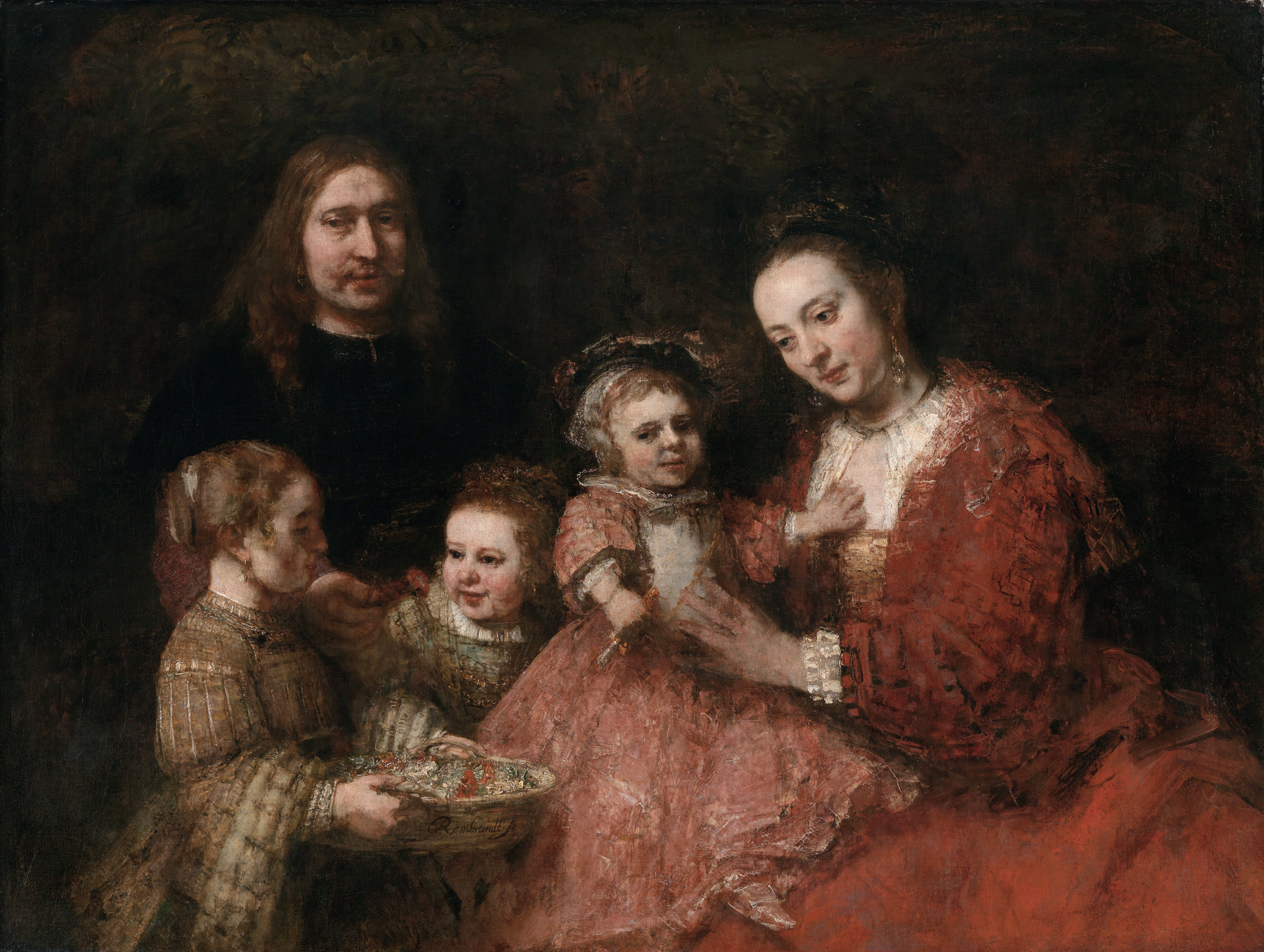
Portrait of a Family, by Rembrandt, 1668–69

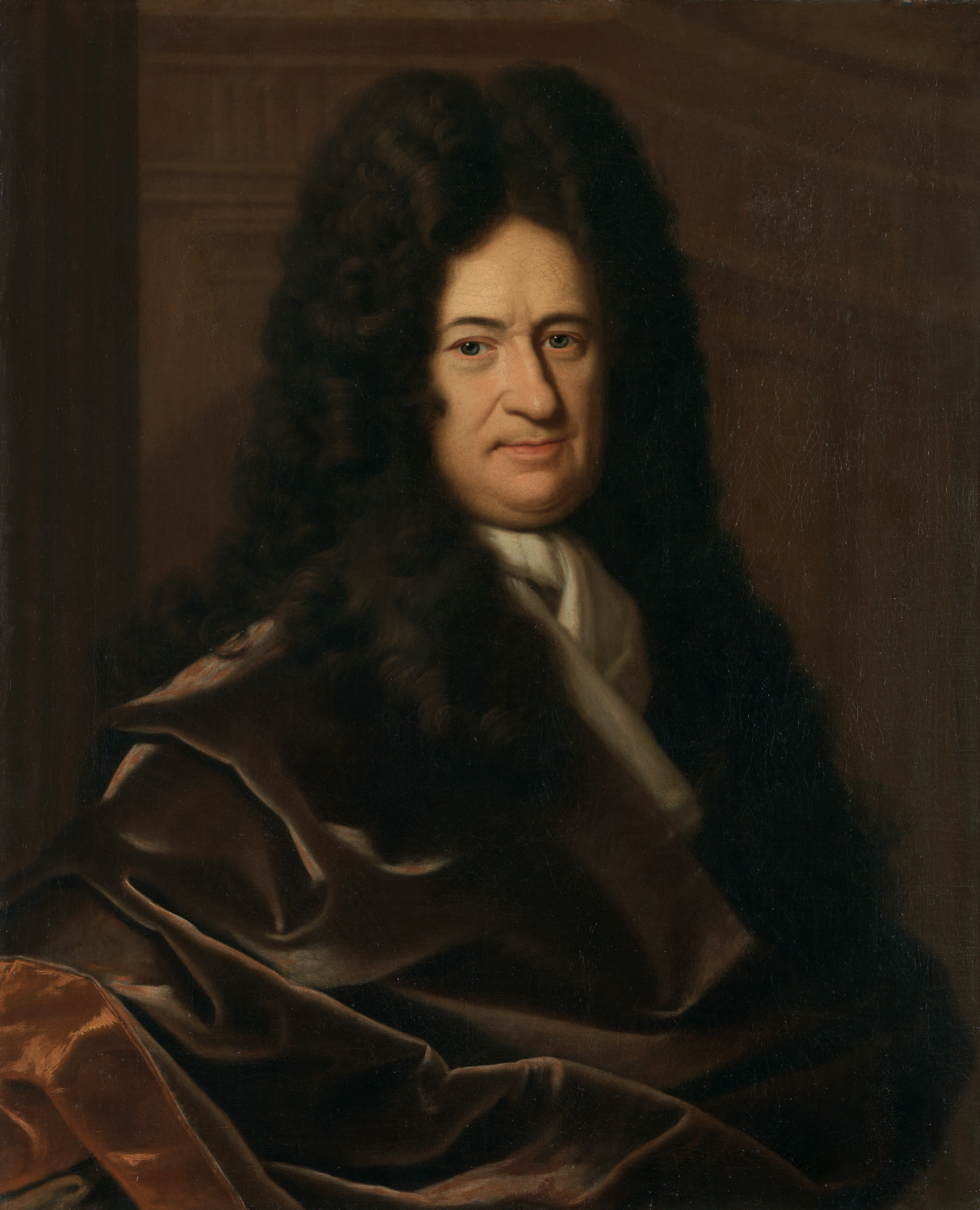
Portrait of Gottfried Wilhelm Leibniz, by Christoph Bernhard Francke, c. 1695

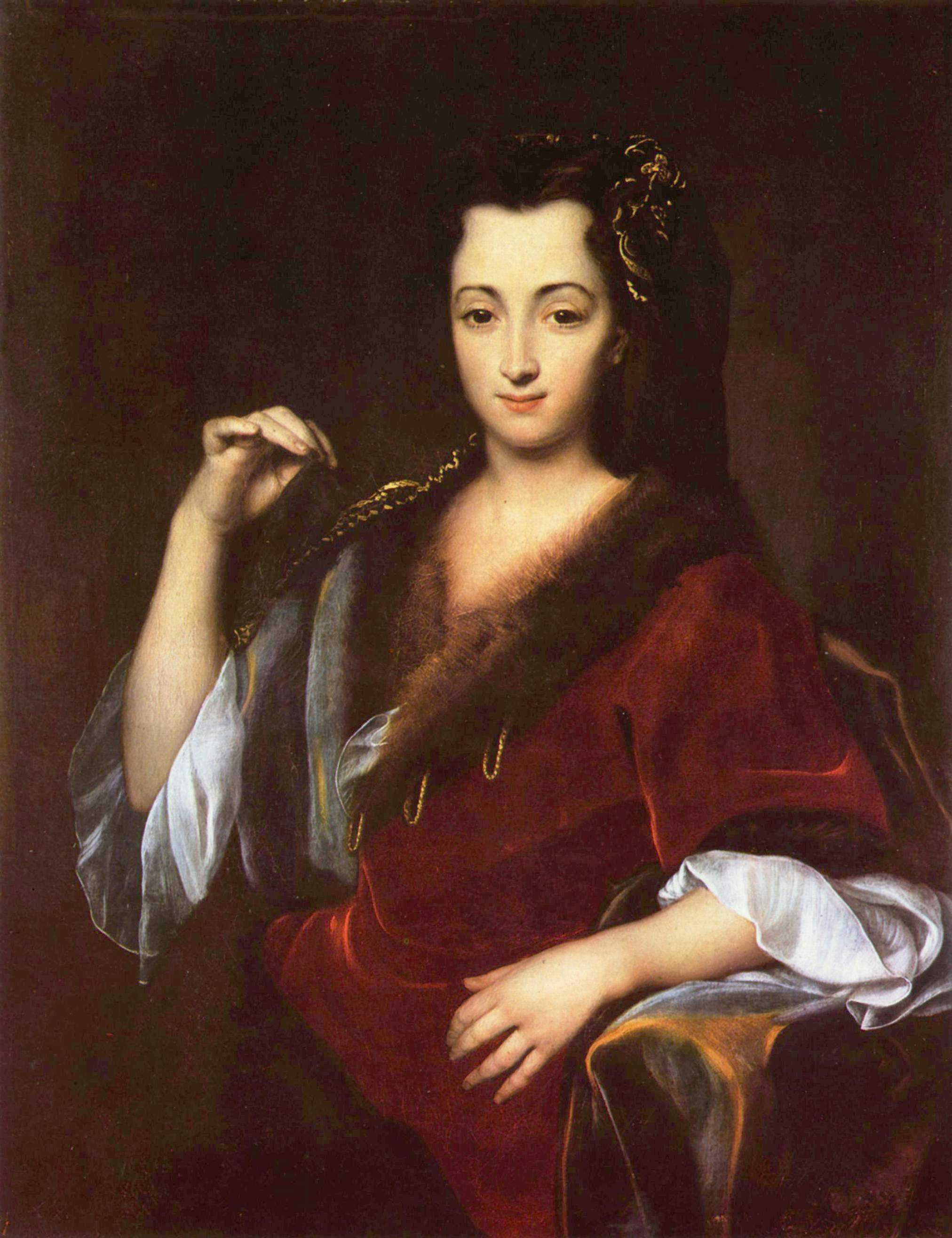
Portrait of a Young Woman, by Jan Kupecký, c. 1710
