= Daniel de Superville (1696–1773) =

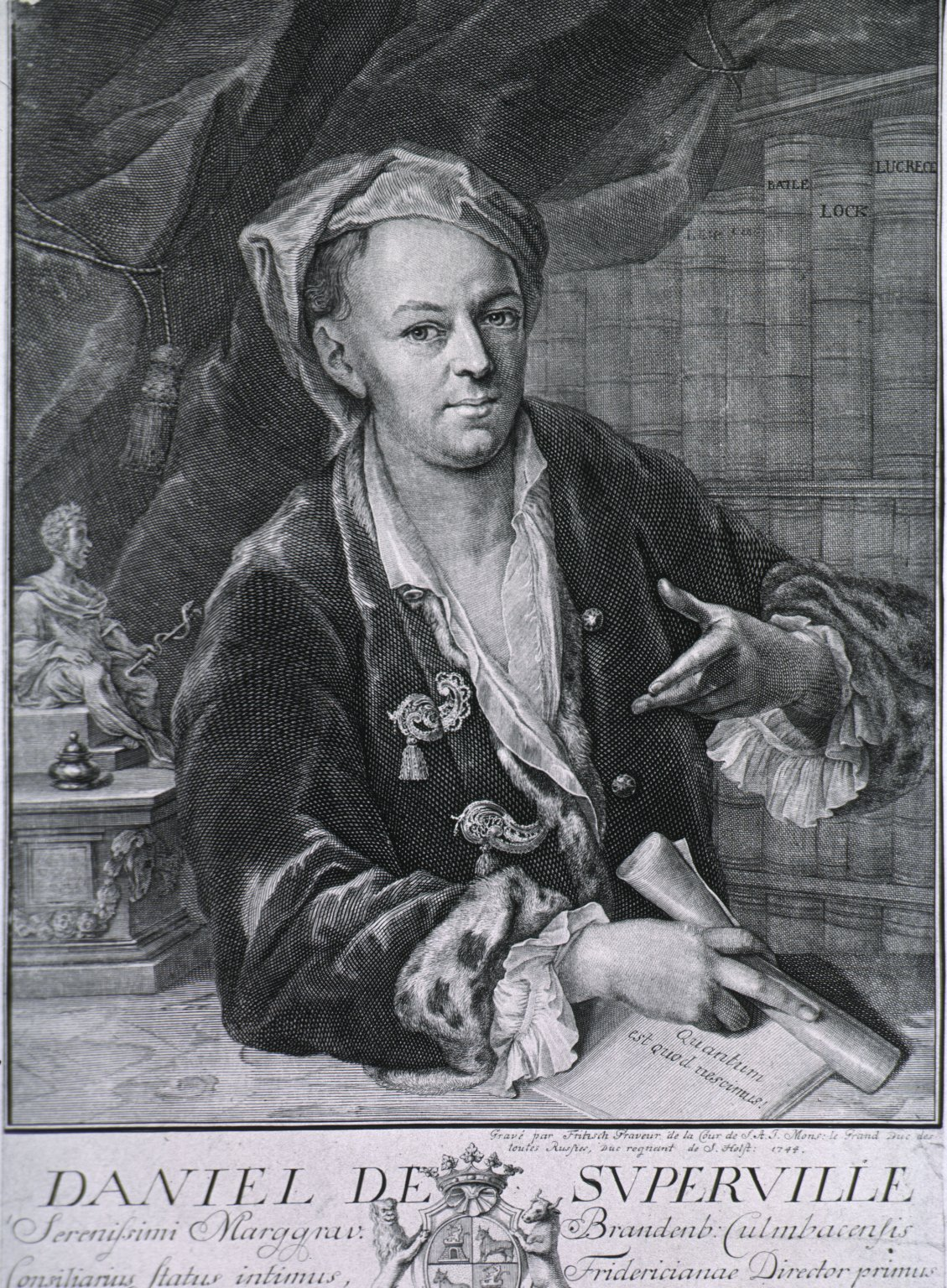
1744 portrait of Daniel de Superville

Daniel de Superville (Rotterdam, 2 December 1696 – Rotterdam, 16 November 1773) was a Dutch physician who in 1742 founded the University of Erlangen in Germany. He served as chancellor of the university until 1748. De Superville also wrote several treatises on anatomy.

Daniel de Superville came from a family of French Huguenots who had fled to the Netherlands from Saumur. He was the third son of merchant Jacques (Jacob) de Superville and Marguérite Vettekeuken. His uncle was the Calvinist theologian Daniel de Superville (1657-1728).

He enrolled at the University of Leiden in 1719, having already gained his doctorate a year earlier at the University of Utrecht with a dissertation entitled Dissertatio de sanguine et sanguificatione. In 1722 he married Catharina Elisabeth le Comte in Leiden, and on 21 June that year the couple left for Prussia, where de Superville found employment as a lecturer of anatomy and surgery in Stettin.

After managing to cure King Frederick Wilhelm I of Prussia of edema (dropsy), Daniel de Superville in 1738 secured a position as the personal physician of Princess Wilhelmine of Prussia, sister of Frederick II. Superville soon became a highly influential advisor at the court of Wilhelmina and her husband, Frederick, Margrave of Brandenburg-Bayreuth. He was admitted to the German imperial academy of sciences in Berlin in 1739 and elected a Fellow of the Royal Society in 1741.

At the initiative of Frederick and Wilhelmina, he founded a Protestant university in Bayreuth in 1743. Superville was appointed as the first rector magnificus of the university. When the university was relocated to Erlangen one year later, Frederick of Brandenburg-Bayreuth appointed himself rector magnificus but kept de Superville on as chancellor. Today, the University of Erlangen is the second largest university in Bavaria.

De Superville remained head of the university until 1748, when he returned – via Bremen - to Braunschweig. From 1754 he managed the Herzog Anton Ulrich Museum and bought several times coins in the Netherlands. In 1761 he settled in Voorburg, near The Hague. In 1770, he remarried after the death of his first wife. Finally, he returned to his birthplace of Rotterdam, where he died at the age of 77. De Superville was buried at the Vrouwekerk in Leiden (demolished in 1819), which at that time served as Walloon church.

== Sources ==
- Kees Vellenga, "In het voetspoor van Röntgen 2008", Historische Commissie van de Nederlandse Vereniging voor Radiologie (Dutch)
- Wer ist wer in Bayreuth: Daniel de Superville (German)
- Nieuw Nederlandsch biografisch woordenboek, deel 6: Superville, Daniel de (3) (Dutch)
- "Superville, Daniel von" in: Allgemeine Deutsche Biographie, 1908 (German)
