= David Pierre Giottino Humbert de Superville =

Dutch painter (1770–1849)

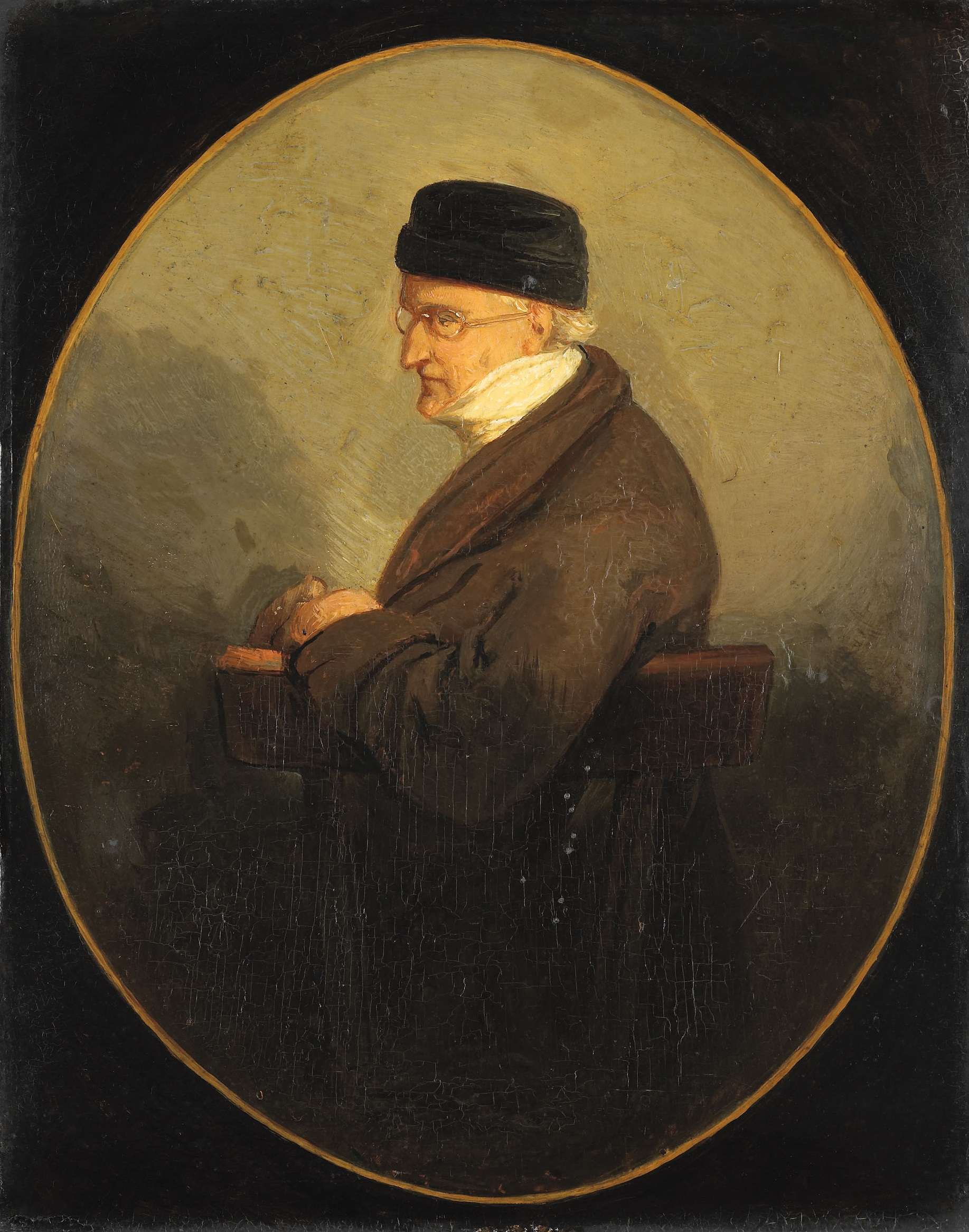
David Pièrre Giottino Humbert de Superville, portrayed by Jacobus Ludovicus Cornet around 1840-1849

David Pierre Giottino Humbert de Superville (The Hague, 18 July 1770 – Leiden, 9 January 1849) was a Dutch artist and art scholar. He was a draughtsman, lithographer, etcher, and portrait painter, and also wrote treatises on art, including the influential work Essai sur les signes inconditionnels dans l'art (Leiden, 1827). His 1815 painting of the jurist and statesman Johan Melchior Kemper is now part of the collection of the Rijksmuseum in Amsterdam.

His 1801 etching Allegory may have been a direct visual inspiration for Paul Gauguin's Spirit of the Dead Watching. Although no direct connection has been made, de Superville was cited by Albert Aurier as one of the forerunners of Symbolist painting and de Superville's book Unconditional Signs in Art (1827–32) was widely known to that group.

A portrait of Humbert de Superville uit 1848, painted by Jacobus Ludovicus Cornet, is now in the Rijksmuseum in Amsterdam. The biography David Pierre Giottin Humbert de Superville, 1770-1849 by Cornelia Magdalena de Haas was published by A.W. Sijthoff in Leiden in 1941. In 1988, an exhibition of Humbert de Superville's work was held at the Musée Fabre in Montpellier (France) and at the Institut Néerlandais in Paris.

== Biography ==
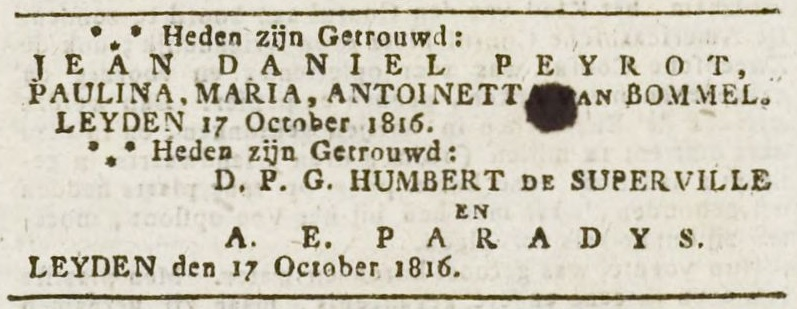
Marriage announcement in the Leydse Courant, 17 October 1816

D.P.G. Humbert de Superville was a son of Jean Humbert, a Dutch painter of Swiss and French extraction. His brother, military engineer Jean Emile Humbert, is credited with rediscovering the lost city of Carthage. Humbert de Superville's assumed name of Giottino was originally a nickname he was given in Italy because his work showed similarities with the Italian master Giotto. He also took the last name de Superville after his grandmother Emilie de Superville, daughter of the eminent French Calvinist theologian Daniel de Superville, who had fled to the Dutch republic in 1685.

He left the Netherlands for Rome from 1789 and lived there until 1800, when the Papal State was restored and Humbert de Superville was forced to leave the city because he had supported the 1798 occupation of Rome by French revolutionary troops. In 1812 he settled in the Dutch town of Leiden and became a lecturer at the University of Leiden. He served as head of the Leiden drawing academy Ars Aemula Naturae (1814–1823) and as first director of the Leiden cabinet of prints, drawings and plaster statues (1825–1849).

Humbert de Superville married Elisabeth Paradijs in 1816. They had two sons, one of whom died at a very young age; the other son died of typhoid at the age of 24.

== Gallery ==
Images from the collection of the Leiden University Library:

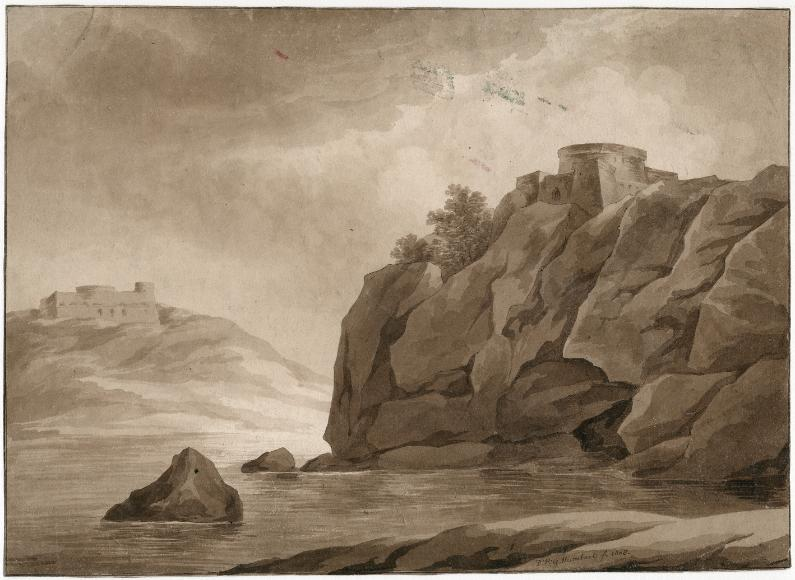

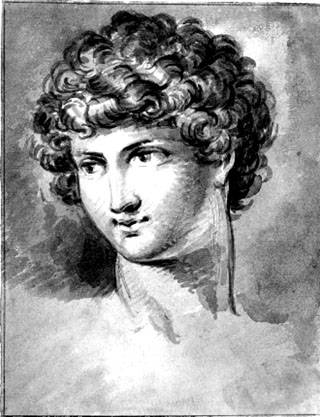

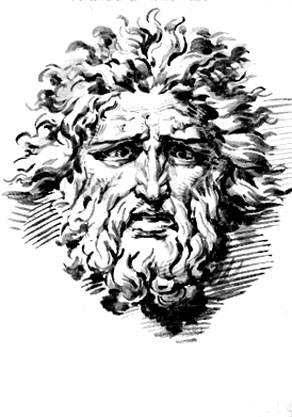

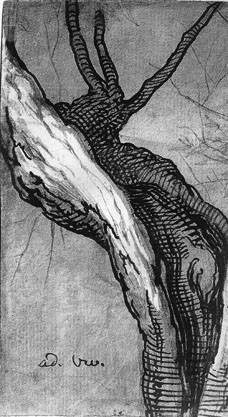

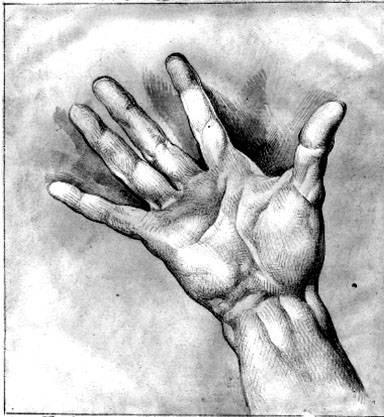

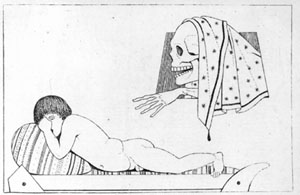
Allegory, 1801

== Sources ==
- Gamboni, Dario (2003). "Paul Gauguin's Genesis of a Picture: A Painter's Manifesto and Self-Analysis". Nineteenth-Century Art Worldwide. 2 (3).
- Nieuw Nederlandsch Biografisch Woordenboek (Dutch)
- Musée Fabre (French)
- Thorbecke-archief, Vol. 2 (1820–1825), Historisch Genootschap (Utrecht) (Dutch)
