= Mark Duncan de Cérisantis =

Mark Duncan de Cérisantis (died 1648) was a Scots-descended French and Swiss diplomat, before becoming secretary to Henry II, Duke of Guise.

== Biography ==
De Cérisantis was the eldest son, Mark Duncan (1570?–1640), was for a time tutor to the Marquis de Faure, and was employed by Richelieu in certain negotiations at Constantinople in 1641; but in consequence of a quarrel with M. de Caudale was compelled to leave France, and entered the Swedish service.

De Cérisantis returned to France as the Swedish ambassador resident in 1645. Shortly afterwards he left the Swedish service, renounced his Protestantism, and went to Rome, where in 1647 he met Henry II, Duke of Guise, then meditating his attempt to wrest the kingdom of Sicily from Spain, whom he accompanied to Naples in the capacity of secretary. He is said also to have been secretly employed by the French king to furnish intelligence of the duke's designs and movements. He died of a wound received in an engagement with the Spaniards in February 1648.

The authenticity of the Mémoires du Duc de Guise, published in 1668, was impugned by the brother of Cérisantis, Saint Helène, mainly on the ground of the somewhat disparaging tone in which Cérisantis is referred to in them. The genuineness of the work is, however, now beyond dispute, and it must be observed that the duke, while imputing to Cérisantis excessive vainglory, gives him credit for skill and intrepidity in the field.

== Works ==
Cérisantis was esteemed one of the most elegant Latinists of his age, and published several poems, of which Carmen Gratulatorium in nuptias Car. R. Ang. cum Henrietta Maria filia Henrici IV R. F. is the most celebrated.
