= Daniel de Superville (1657–1728) =

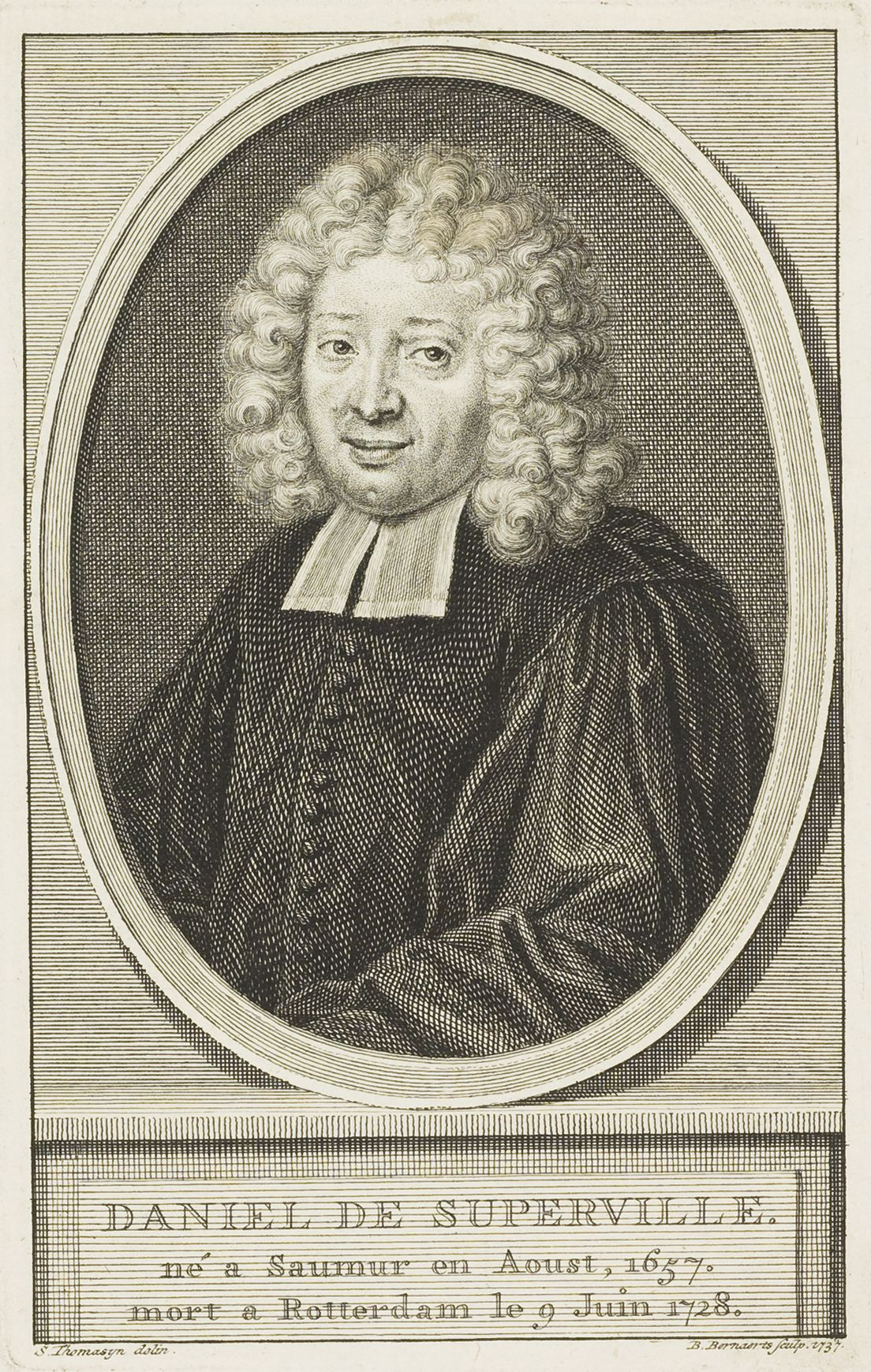
Daniel de Superville

Daniel de Superville (August 1657 in Saumur – 9 June 1728 in Rotterdam), also known as Daniel de Superville père (as his son was also called Daniel), was a Huguenot pastor and theologian who fled France for the Dutch Republic in 1685 and became the minister of the Walloon church in Rotterdam. He is known particularly for his published Sermons.

== Writings ==
Daniel de Superville is best known for his Sermons sur divers textes de l'Écriture sainte. This collection of sermons was published in three volumes, the first of which was published in 1700. It was reprinted a number of times. In 1743 a fourth volume was published, containing 12 sermons. An English translation of the Sermons was published in 1816 by John Allen.

His first publication was a series of 12 letters, Lettres sur les devoirs de l'église affligée ("On the Duties of the Afflicted Church"), in November 1691. In 1706 he also published a catechism entitled Les vérites et les devoirs de la religion chrétienne ("The Truths and Duties of Religion"), and in 1718 he published the treaty Le vrai communiant, ou Traité de la sainte cène et des moiens d'y bien participer ("The True Communicant"), translated into Dutch as De ware dischgenoot (1737).

== Life and career ==
Daniel de Superville's family originated in Osse-en-Aspe in Béarn, in the French Pyrenees. His great-grandfather Jean de Superville served as personal physician to King Henry IV of France. His grandfather and father, both called Jacques de Superville, were also physicians, the former in Niort, the latter in Saumur.

De Superville was born in Saumur and studied theology there. From 1677 to 1679, he also followed studies in theology in Geneva. In 1683 he became a pastor of the Protestant church in Loudun. As part of King Louis XIV's persecution of Huguenots, the dragonnades instituted in 1681, he was charged in mid-1685 with preaching a seditious sermon and was detained in Paris for three months to await trial. Following Louis XIV's Edict of Fontainebleau in October 1685, revoking the Edict of Nantes, Daniel de Superville and 600 of his followers fled France to seek asylum in the Dutch Republic. There, he and his first wife, Elisabeth de Monnery, settled in Maastricht.

He was invited to become a pastor of the Walloon churches in both Berlin and Hamburg but decided instead to accept an invitation to become assistant pastor of the congregation in Rotterdam. He was appointed to that position on 13 January 1686. In 1691 he was invited to become pastor of the Eglise française de la Savoye in London. In order to keep him in Rotterdam, the local authorities offered to make him a full pastor in Rotterdam instead. He accepted the position and remained pastor until he was succeeded by one of his sons (also named Daniel de Superville) on 13 September 1725.

De Superville worked to have the Protestant Church in France restored and to have the Protestant preachers imprisoned in France (the so-called galériens) freed. During the peace negotiations leading up to the Peace of Utrecht in 1713, he travelled frequently to Utrecht to meet with foreign dignitaries in order to secure the release of the galériens.

== Family ==
He was married twice. He married Elisabeth de Monnery in France in 1683 and had two children with her. She died a few weeks after the couple settled in Rotterdam in 1686, and both children died before he remarried in 1694 to Catherine van Armeiden. With his second wife, he had seven children, of which three sons and three daughters survived him. On 18 July 1709, he, his wife and their six children were naturalized as citizens of the Dutch Republic. His wife, Catherine, who had also fled to Holland from France, died in 1719.

Surviving children were:

- Catharine (baptised on 18 April 1696)
- Emilie (30 October 1698)
- Daniel (13 June 1700)
- Jean (1 September 1702)
- Christine Elisabeth (8 June 1704)
- Pierre Jacques (21 September 1708)

His son, Daniel de Superville (1700-1762) succeeded him as pastor of the Walloon Church in Rotterdam.

His daughter Emilie married Pierre Humbert, a merchant from Geneva who had settled in Amsterdam in 1706 as a bookseller and publisher. Their son Jean Humbert de Superville (1734–1794) was a portrait painter. Jean's son, Jean Emile Humbert (1771–1839), was a lieutenant-colonel credited with rediscovering ancient Carthage, and his son David Pierre Giottino Humbert de Superville was an artist and art scholar who authored the influential Essai sur les signes inconditionnels dans l'art.

Daniel de Superville's nephew Daniel de Superville (1696-1773), a son of his brother Jacques, was a physician who founded the University of Erlangen in 1742.
