= Jean Humbert (painter) =

Dutch painter

Jean Humbert de Superville (7 May 1734 – buried 22 September 1794) was a Dutch painter of Swiss and French extraction. Humbert was primarily known as a portrait painter.

Humbert was born in Amsterdam. He was the son of Pierre Humbert, a merchant from Geneva who had settled in Amsterdam in 1706 as a bookseller and publisher, and his second wife Emilie de Superville, daughter of Daniel de Superville, a Calvinist theologian from Saumur who had fled to the Dutch republic in 1685.

Humbert studied painting in Paris, where he served as apprentice to Jean Fournier and subsequently probably also to Joseph-Marie Vien. In 1761 or 1762 he moved from Amsterdam to The Hague. In 1767 he became an apprentice of the academy of drawing of the local painter's guild Confrerie Pictura. In 1787 he was chosen as one of the guild officers and in 1792 he was even elected as head of the guild.

He painted portraits as well as historic and mythological subjects. His portrait subjects included Dutch East India Company official Abraham du Bois (1760), politician Hendrik Fagel (1766) and writer Isabelle de Charrière (1769). The portrait of du Bois originally hung in the Dutch East India Company offices in Rotterdam, but is now part of the collection of the Rijksmuseum in Amsterdam.

Humbert designed the ornate decorations of the facade of The Hague's town hall during the wedding of Stadtholder William V to Wilhelmina of Prussia in 1767. He also painted a room in the courthouse of The Hague. A work by Humbert hung in the stadtholder quarters at the Binnenhof but it was removed around 1808 along with a number of other paintings during a remodeling ordered by king Louis Bonaparte, who had used the stadtholder quarters as a royal palace since 1806.

In 1768, Humbert married Elisabeth Antoinette Deel. The marriage produced seven children, including:

- Jean Emile Humbert, a military engineer credited with rediscovering ancient Carthage
- David Pierre Giottino Humbert de Superville, a scholar and artist who wrote the influential Essai sur les signes inconditionnels dans l'art.

Humbert died in 1794 and was buried in Amstelveen.

== Sources ==
- Nieuw Nederlands Biografisch Woordenboek (Dutch)
- Nieuw Nederlands Biografisch Woordenboek (Dutch)
- Nieuw Nederlands Biografisch Woordenboek (Dutch)
- Pieter Wagenaar, Marie-Christine Engels en Chales Dumas: Den Haag: Geschiedenis van de stad. Deel 2: De tijd van de republiek. Zwolle, 2005 (Dutch)
- Trudie Rosa de Carvalho-Roos, "Hoe houdt de stadhouder hof?" Oud Holland, Vol. 116, Nrs. 3-4, 2003, pp. 121-223 (Dutch)
