= Beni Otsmane =

- Commune and town
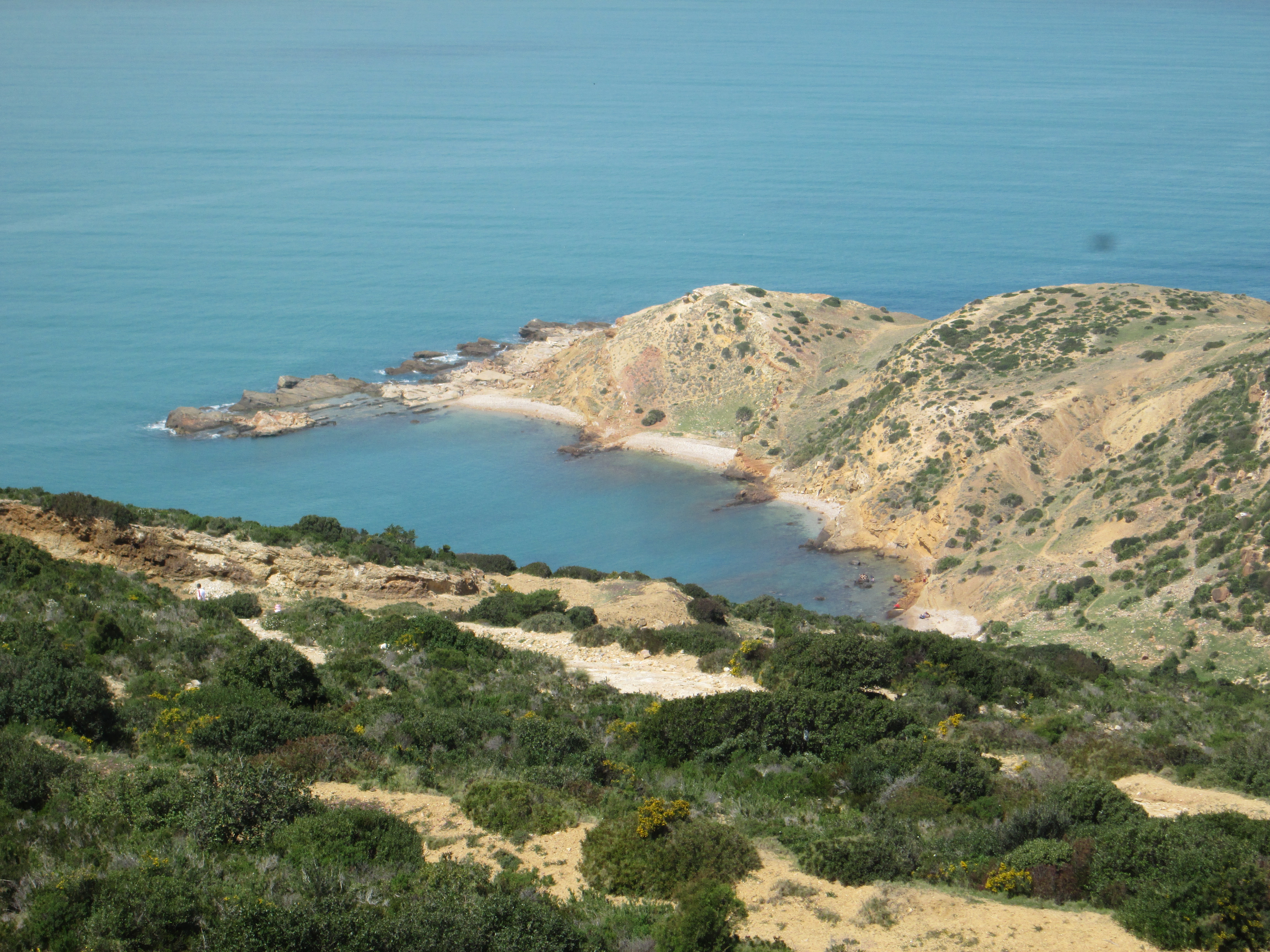
- country side near Beni Otsmane
- Interactive map of Beni Otsmane
- Coordinates: 36°49′0.01″N 10°37′59.99″E
- Country: Tunisia
- Governorate: Nabeul Governorate
- Elevation: 348 ft (106 m)
- Time zone: UTC+1 (CET)

Beni Otsmane is a village of Tunisia which lies on the Cape Bon peninsula near the village of Sidi Rais and Korbous. Surrounded by the Qorbus Forest, the area has been popular as a health resort since Roman times.

The name is derived from the Banī ‘Uthmān Tribe that traditionally have lived in the area.
