= 2006–2007 Tunisia clashes =

Skirmishes in Soliman and Hammam-Lif, Tunisia

- Part of Insurgency in the Maghreb (2002–present)
Date	23 December 2006 – 3 January 2007
Location	Soliman and Hammam-Lif, Tunisia
Result	Tunisian government victory

Belligerents
Tunisia	GSPC

Commanders and leaders
	Lassaad Sassi

Casualties and losses
2 dead	14 dead, 17 arrested
- 60 dead

On 23 December 2006 and 3 January 2007, Tunisian security forces engaged in clashes with members of a group with connections to the Islamist terror group Salafist Group for Preaching and Combat (GSPC) in the towns of Soliman and Hammam-Lif south of the capital Tunis, killing more than a dozen people.

== Clashes ==
On 23 December, two Islamists were killed and two arrested in a shootout with police in the town of Hammam-Lif south of Tunis.

On 3 January, at least two members of Tunisian security forces and twelve Islamists were killed, and fifteen arrested in a clash in a forested area near Soliman.

Among those killed was the leader of the group, Lassaad Sassi, a former Tunisian policeman who had spent time in Afghanistan and headed a terror network based in Milan, Italy. Sassi's group had reportedly established training camps in the mountains in Djebel Ressas and Boukornine south of the Tunisian capital.

According to French daily Le Parisien at least 60 people were killed in the clashes. It was later revealed that the Islamists had been in possession of blueprints of foreign embassies as possible targets. The attacks were the most serious by Islamists in Tunisia since the Ghriba synagogue bombing in 2002.
