= Hammam-Lif Palace =

Former beylical Palace in Hammam-Lif, Tunisia

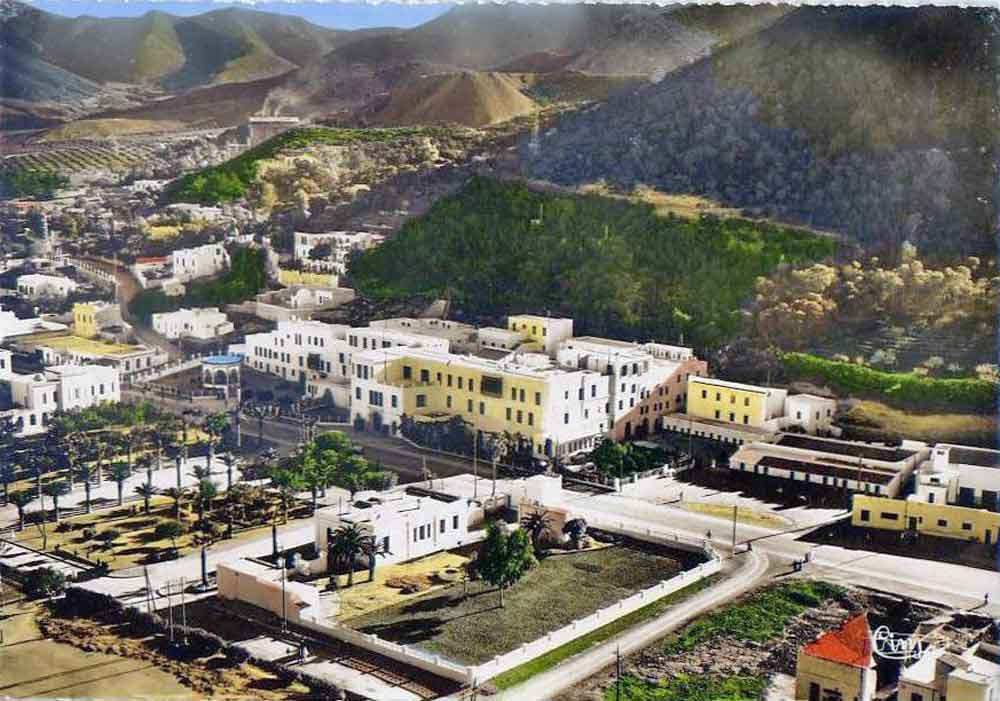
Hammam-Lif palace

The Hammam-Lif Palace was a winter residence of the Tunisian Beys, in Hammam-Lif, Tunisia. It was a favourite residence of the Husainid dynasty, but it is now in an advanced state of dilapidation.

== History ==
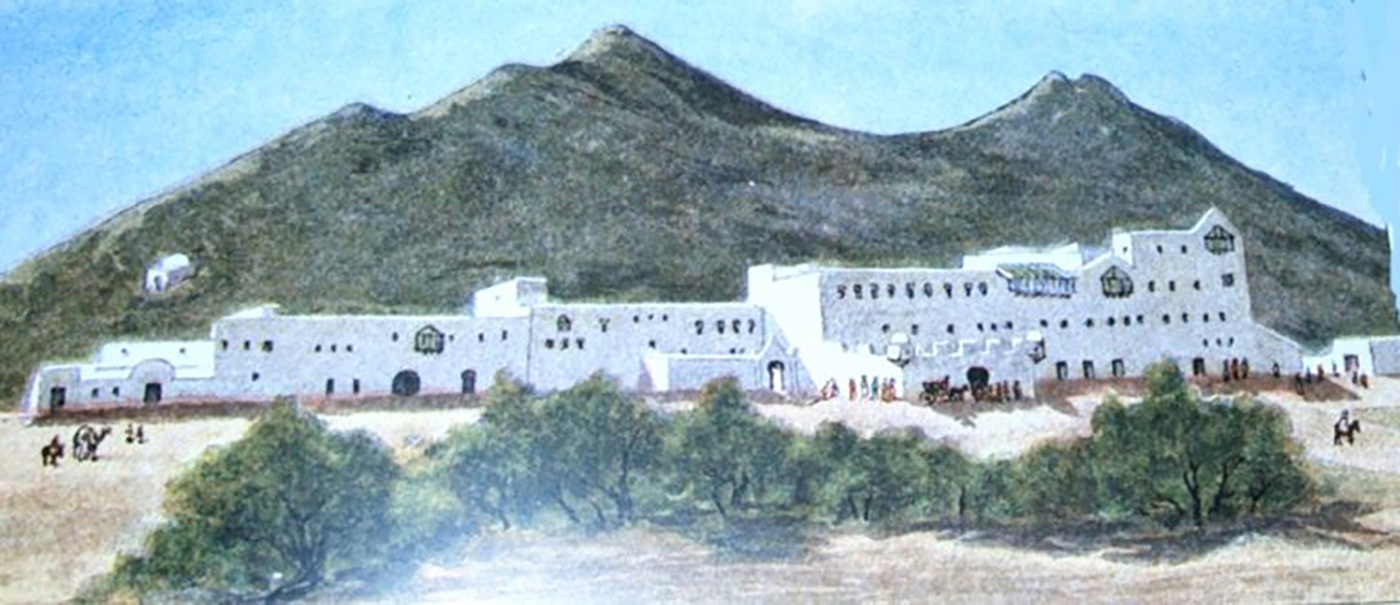
The palace at the start of the 20th century

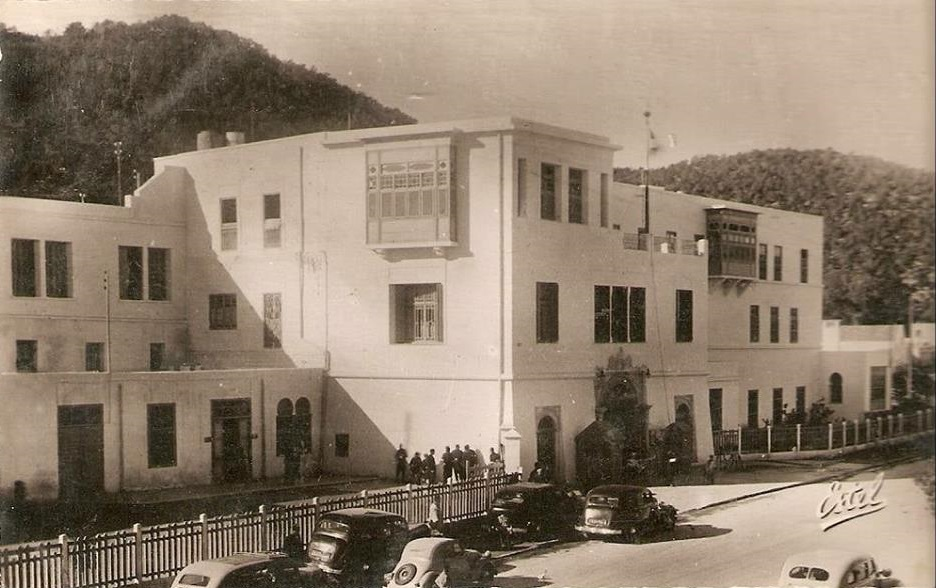
Hammam-Lif palace in the first half of the 20th century

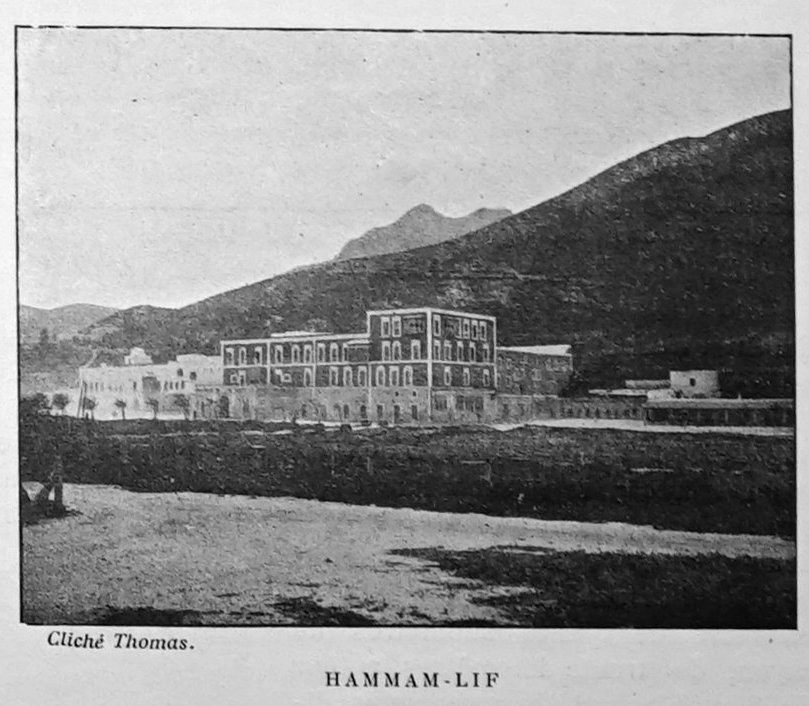
Hammam-Lif palace in June 1900

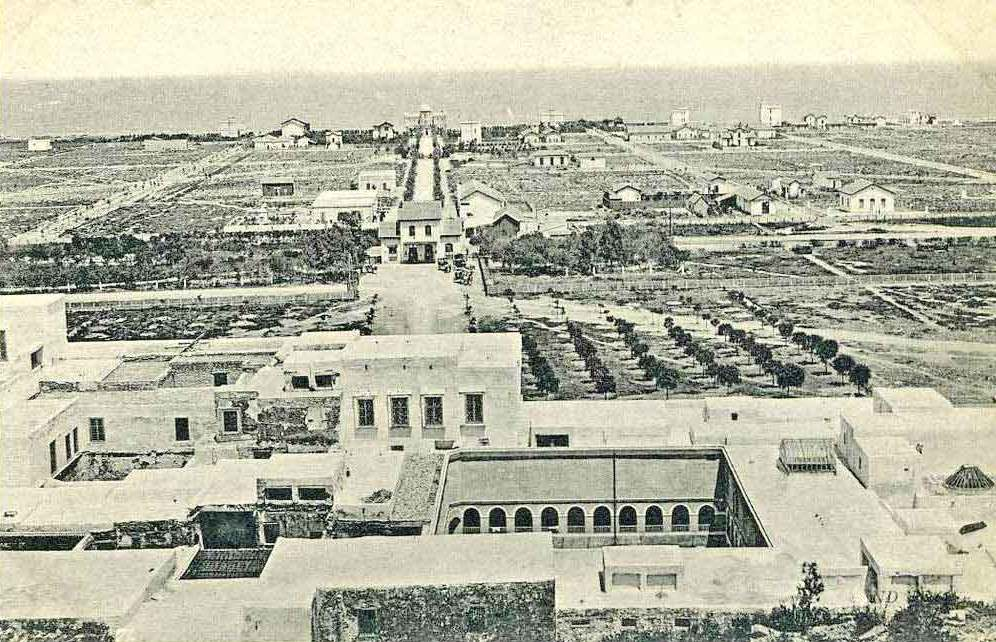
View over the palace

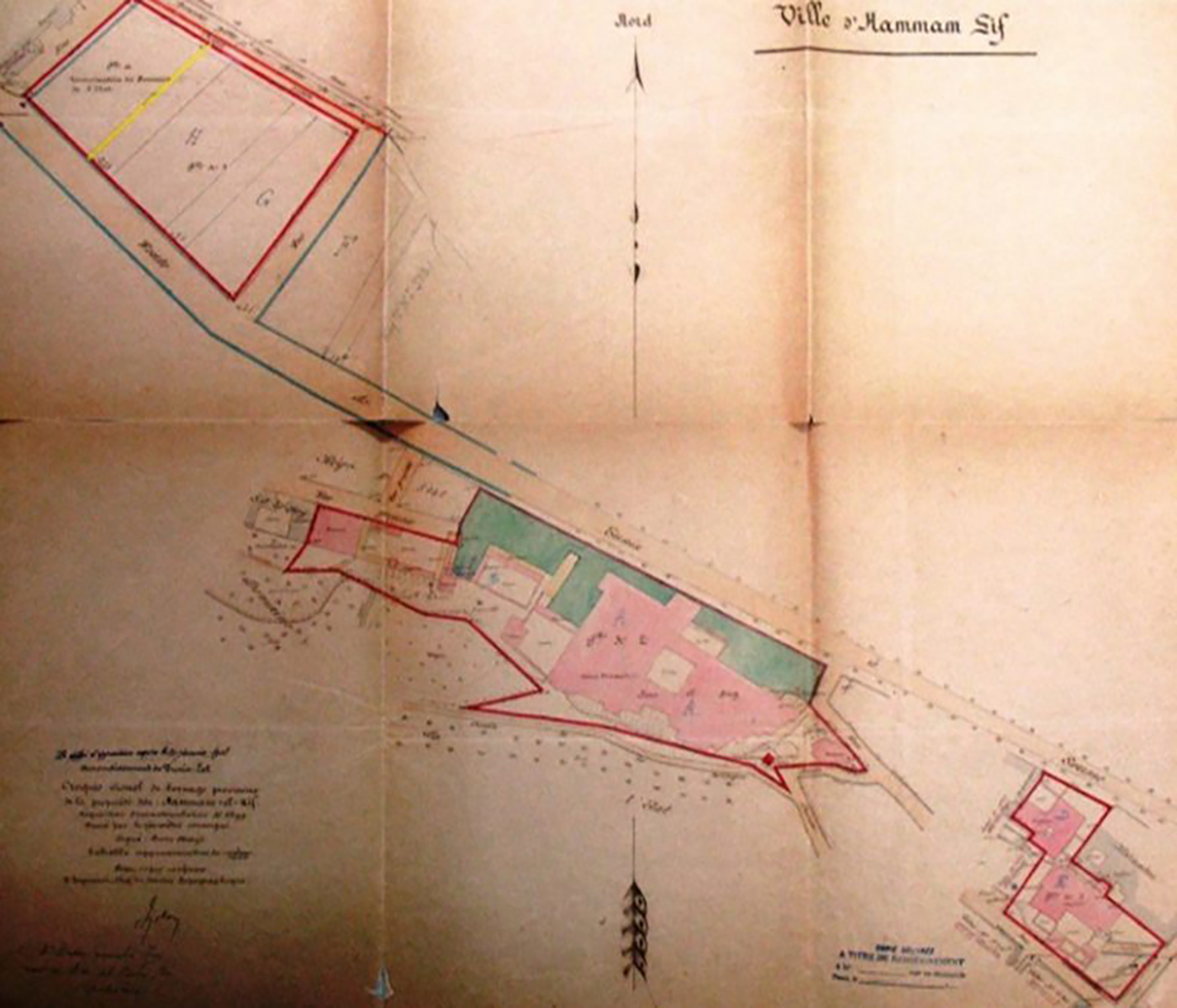
Plan of Hammam-Lif and its surroundings

In addition to their residences in Bardo, La Marsa, and La Manouba, the monarchs of the Husainid dynasty gradually developed the habit, starting in the 18th century, of staying more and more often in Hammam Lif during the winter. In the mid-century, it was their interest in the baths of Hammam Lif that led the beys to build a permanent residence there. A pavilion was built around 1750, during the reign of Ali Bey I (1688–1756), thanks to the thermal waters that emerge at the foot of Jebel Boukornine from two sources named Aïn El Bey and Aïn El Ariane.

In 1826, Hussein II Bey (1784–1835) decided to build a palace next to a Caravanserai; the majority of this building still exists today. The building, upon completion of the works, includes a massive ground floor and two floors, with twenty windows with awnings overlooking the sea. At the northwest corner of the palace, Hussein II Bey built a kiosk, Bit el-Makaaad, a kind of covered but not enclosed gallery where he spent his leisure hours. He also built private baths, accessible from the outside; reserved for the exclusive use of women, these baths are complemented by a second bath open to men, in the opposite part of the palace.

Muhammad Bey (1811–1859) added a third floor to Hussein II Bey's palace; he also modified Bit el-Makaaad. During the reign of Nasir Bey (1855–1922), the third floor, which was in danger of collapse, was removed. However, he restored and furnished several rooms, as well as the service apartments. Since Hussein II Bey, and with the exception of Ali III Bey (1817–1902) and his son Hédi Bey (1855–1906), all sovereigns stayed at the palace until the abolition of the monarchy in 1957.

After Tunisian Independence in 1956, the beylical palace housed a women's vocational training center. Subsequently, families in need occupied it and transformed it into an oukala (collective residence). Today, in the absence of restoration, the palace is in an advanced state of dilapidation.

On 15 March 2022, the palace was classified as a monument.

== Literature ==
- Gandolphe, Marcel (1941). Résidences Beylicales: Le Bardo- La Mohammedia- Kassar-Said - La Manouba – Hammam-Lif. Cahiers d'histoire tunisienne (in French). Tunis: Editions SAPI Tunisia.
- Revault, Jacques (1974). Palais et résidences d'été de la région de Tunis (XVIe-XIXe siècles) (in French). Paris: Editions du Centre National de la Recherche Scientifique. pp. 414–426. ISBN 2-222-01622-3.
- Regaieg, Nadia (1999). Restauration et reconversion du palais beylical d'Hammam-Lif (mémoire de fin d'études en Architecture) (Thesis) (in French). Tunis: ENAU.
- Abidi, Beya (2005). Palais des beys aux environs de la ville de Tunis, El-Abdaliya à la Marsa et Dar el-Bey à Hammam-Lif (en arabe) (mémoire de master) (Thesis) (in Arabic). Tunis: Facultés des Lettres, des Arts et des Humanités de Manouba.
- Moumni, Ridha (2016). L'Éveil d'une nation [exposition, Tunis, Palais Qsar es-Saïd, du 27 novembre 2016 au 27 février 2017] (in French). Tunis: Officina Libraria. p. 246. ISBN 978-88-99765-25-5.
- Abidi-Belhadj, Beya (2016). "Dar el-Bey d'Hammam-Lif aux XVIIIe-XIXe siècles: prémices del'architecture thermale à Tunis". Al- Sabîl: Revue d'Histoire, d'Archéologie et d'Architecture Maghrébines (in French). 2.
