= El Brij, Tunisia =

Nabeul Governorate in Tunisia

El Brij, is a village of Tunisia, at latitude 36°48'13.44" and Longitude 10°36'8.95" on the Cape Bon peninsula near the village of Sidi Rais and Korbous. Surrounded by the Qorbus Forest and with access to beaches for the residents of Carthage, the area has been popular as a health resort since Roman times.

It is part of Nabeul Governorate.

El Brij has a mosque with a tall square minaret.

== See also ==
- Kerkouane
- Sidi Rais
- Korbous
- Cap Bon
