= Sidi Rais =

Village in Tunisia

Sidi Raïs سيدي رايس
- Village and locality
- Location within Tunisia
- Coordinates: 36°49′N 10°34′E
- Country: Tunisia
- Governorate: Nabeul
- Delegation: Korbous

Sidi Raïs is a village and locality on Cape Bon in Tunisia.

It is located on the Gulf of Tunis ( خليج تونس ) and is notable as the last place that the Posidonia oceanica a marine phanerogam persists on the surface of the water (so-called "reef" form). It is near the bath town of Korbous. Surrounded by the Qorbus Forest and beaches of the Mediterranean, the area has been popular as a health resort for residents of Carthage since Roman times, and extensive ruins can be found to the north near Korbous.

== See also ==
- El Brij, Tunisia
- Kerkouane
- Cap Bon
