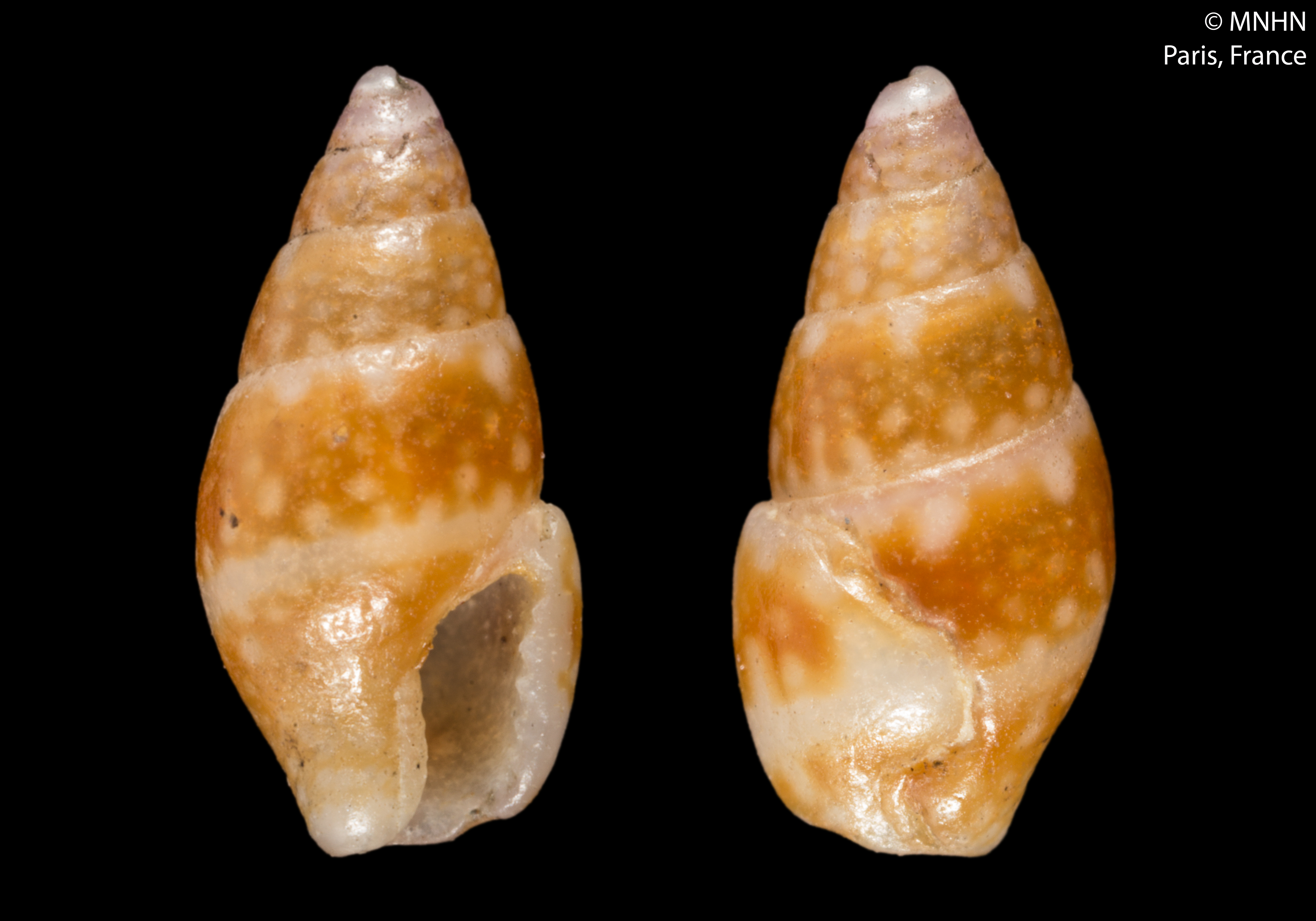
- Shell of Mitrella psilla (lectotype at MNHN, Paris)

Scientific classification
- Kingdom: Animalia
- Phylum: Mollusca
- Class: Gastropoda
- Subclass: Caenogastropoda
- Order: Neogastropoda
- Family: Columbellidae
- Genus: Mitrella
- Species: M. psilla

Binomial name
- Mitrella psilla (Duclos, 1846)

Synonyms
- Colombella japix Duclos, 1848; Colombella philodicia Duclos, 1846; Colombella psilla Duclos, 1846 (original combination)

= Mitrella psilla =

Species of gastropod

Mitrella psilla is a species of sea snail in the family Columbellidae, the dove snails.

== Description ==
The length of the shell attains 4.8 mm.

== Distribution ==
This marine species occurs off West Africa, from Mauritania to Senegal, and in the provinces of Benguela and Namibe, Angola (Rolán, 2005). It was introduced into the Gulf of Tunis, Mediterranean Sea. The species was also detected in Italy.
