= Jebel Boukornine =

Mountain in Tunisia

Coordinates: 36°42′18″N 10°20′00″E

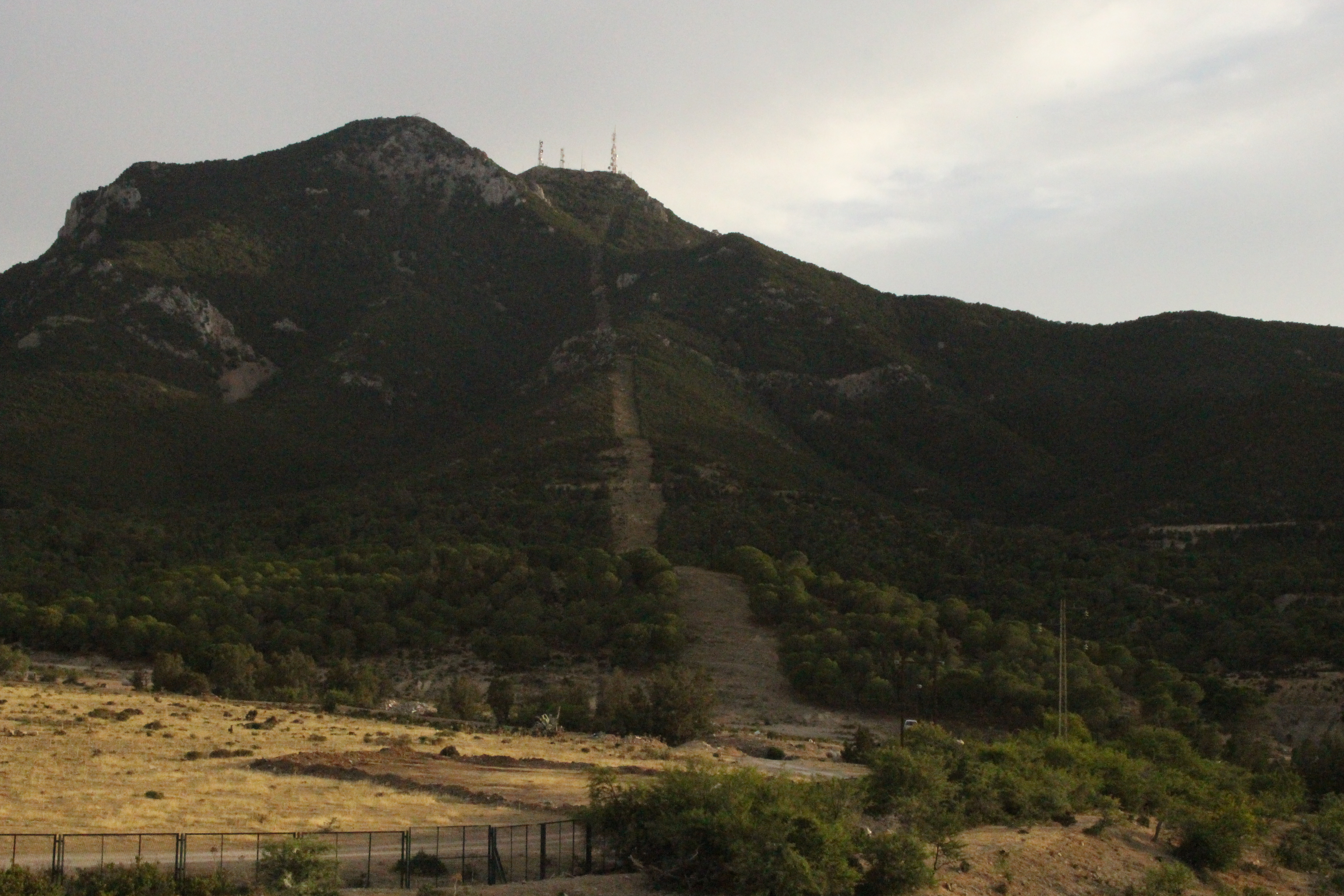
Jebel Boukornine

Jebel Boukornine (Tunisian Arabic: جبل بُوقَرْنِين [ʒəbəl buː qɔrniːn] 'Mountain of the Two-Horned'), also spelled Djebel Bou Kornine or Mount Bou Kornine, is a 576 metres (1,890 ft) mountain in northern Tunisia overlooking the Gulf of Tunis and the city of Hammam Lif. It consists of folded and faulted outcrops of Jurassic limestone.

Its name, "the one with two horns", is originally from the Punic language. It owes its name to the two highlights of altitude 576 and 493 meters at the top. In ancient Carthage, the mountain was considered sacred and religious rituals were conducted there, and the deity in question was Baal Hammon, who was represented with two horns.

The massif is part of Boukornine National Park, covering an area of 1,939 hectares (4,790 acres) and protecting many species of plants and animals. The mountain slopes are covered with Aleppo pine and cedar.

Djebel Ressas, about 30 kilometres (19 mi) to the southwest is a taller peak at 795 metres (2,608 ft).
