= Necropolis of Kerkouane =

Necropolis in Tunisia

Coordinates: 36°57′21″N 11°5′11″E

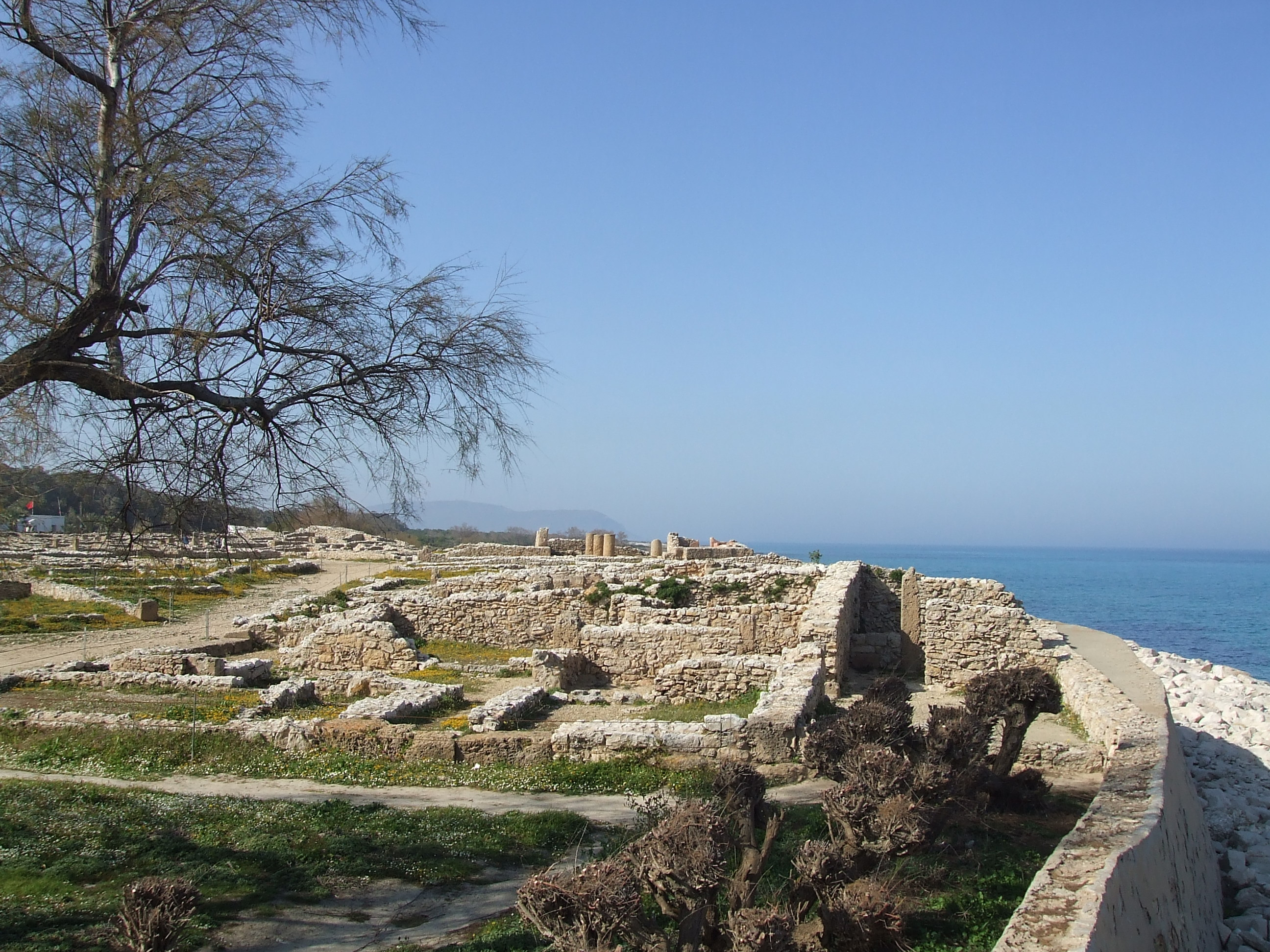
View of Kerkouane seaside

The Necropolis of Kerkouane is an ancient cemetery located approximately 1.5 km (0.93 mi) northwest of the Punic city of Kerkouane in northeastern Tunisia. The necropolis consists of a series of vaults set in a seaside hill, four primary chamber-tombs, and a surrounding burial area. In 1985, UNESCO declared Kerkouane and its necropolis a World Heritage Site, because "[t]he remains constitute the only example of a Phoenicio-Punic city to have survived."

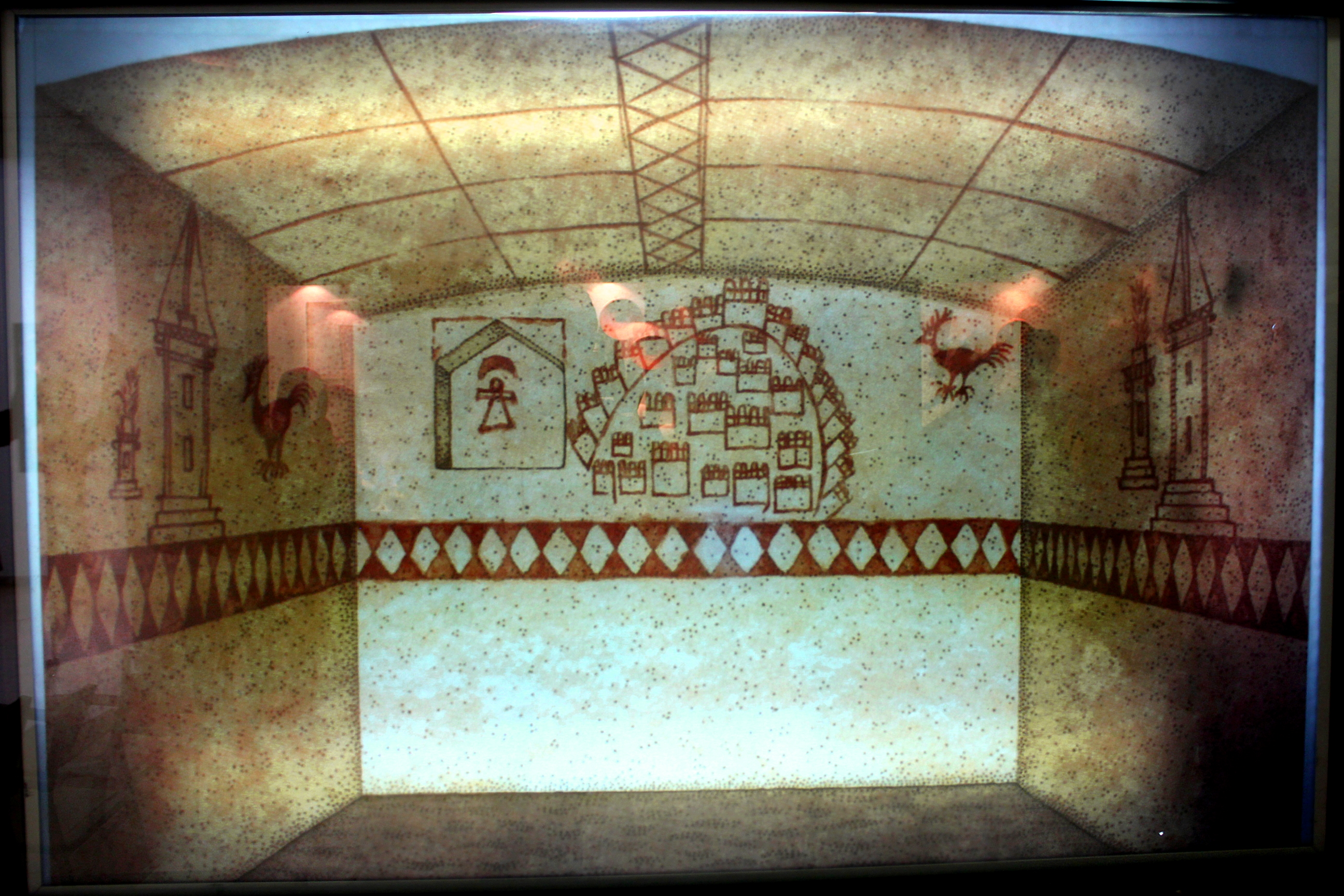
A panoramic view of the interior of one of the Punic tombs of Kerkouane decorated with murals that include the sign of Tanit

The necropolis was discovered in 1929 by a local Islamic schoolteacher. This schoolteacher found a large store of buried possessions in the tombs, the most valuable of which he proceeded to sell to treasure hunters and collectors. The sold loot variously included jewellery, ceramics, and scarab gems. Many of the funerary objects and large pottery were too burdensome to be removed, and so were left in the tombs or destroyed. The discovery of the necropolis was not formally documented until some time later, after the schoolteacher revealed his source of wealth to an enquiring law officer.

Further excavations have since been undertaken by historians and archaeologists. Many of the objects recovered have been sundries with little value, left over from the schoolteacher's pillage and the ransacks of grave robbers after him: bones, eggs, altars, amulets, bronze coins, razors, toiletries, obsidian and basalt relics, and earrings, among others. Exceptions include an ancient Greek signet ring; a jasper scarab depicting an animalistic Egyptian god; and a set of rare perfume flasks, which was claimed by the Fragonard museum in Grasse, France.

The most precious find to date is a red-painted sarcophagus with a cover in the shape of a woman identified as the goddess Astarte (Ishtar), protector of the dead, or one of her worshippers. The woman is dressed in a robe and wears a sacred crown known as a polos. She is covered in red, blue, and yellow plaster, and is – with the exception of her feet – perfectly intact. The sarcophagus is prized as one of the only known Punic wood carvings still existing; for this reason, it was taken to Zurich, Switzerland for treatment shortly after its discovery. When news of the find broke, the carved woman was dubbed "the princess of Kerkouane" by the Tunisian press. The sarcophagus now rests in the Kerkouane site museum.
