= Baal Hammon =

Chief god in ancient Carthaginian religion

- Weather and Vegetative Fertility; King of the Gods
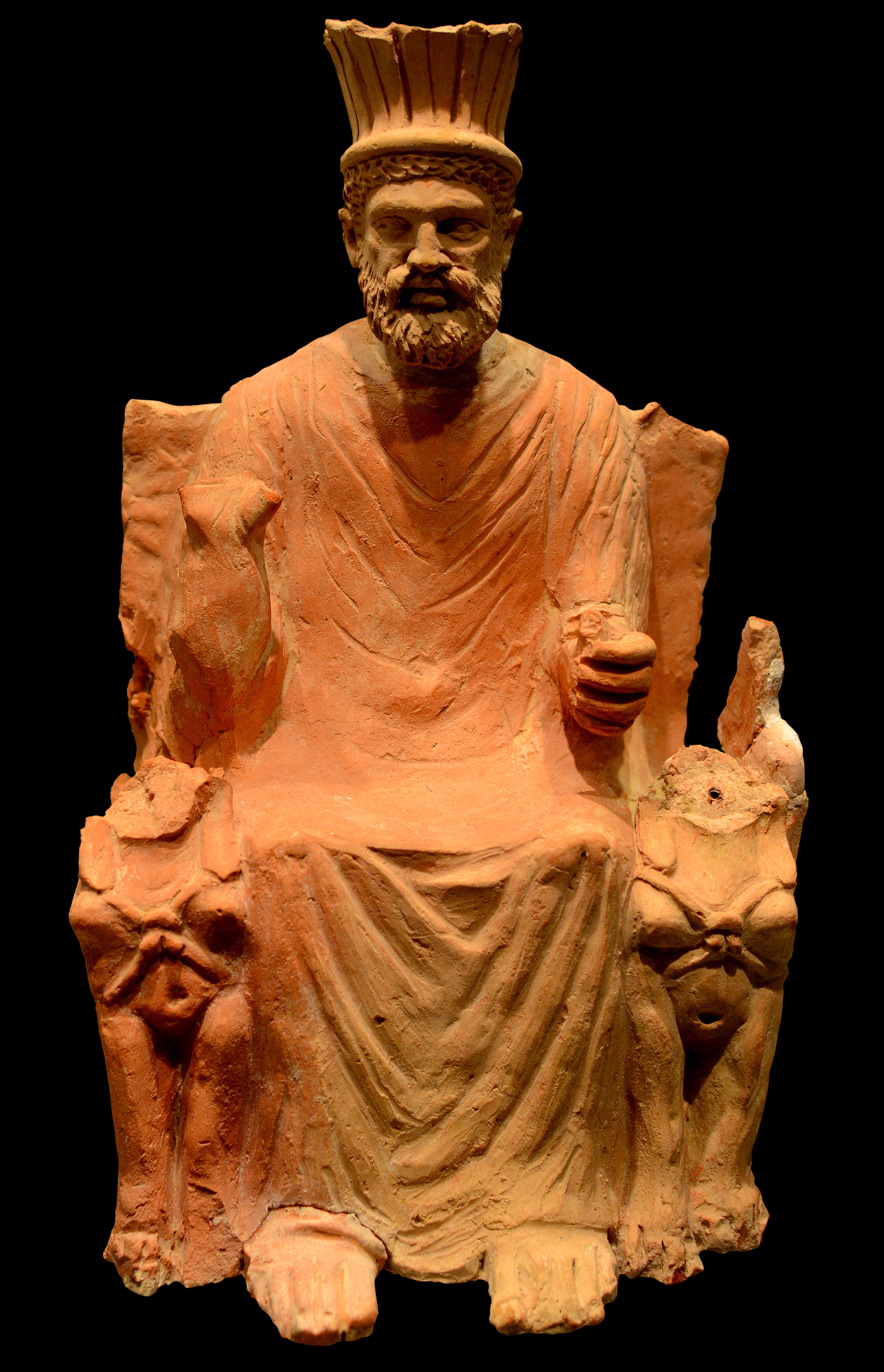
- Statue of Baʿal Hammon on his throne with a crown and flanked by sphinges, 1st century.
- Other names: Ammon, Hammon
- Venerated in: Carthage, Numidia
- Major cult centre: Siwa Oasis, Jebel Boukornine, Volubilis
- Abode: Heavens
- Mount: Jebel Boukornine
- Gender: Male
- Temples: Jebel Boukornine; Cirta; Iol; Hippo Regius; Timgad; Volubilis

Genealogy
- Consort: Tanit
- Children: Gurzil, Iarbas

Equivalents
- Canaanite: Baal, El
- Greek: Cronus, Zeus-Ammon, Zeus
- Roman: Saturn, Jupiter-Ammon, Jupiter

Ba'al Hammon (Punic: 𐤁𐤏𐤋 𐤇𐤌𐤍, romanized: Baʿl Ḥamōn), meaning "Lord Hammon", was a Punic-Berber syncretic deity and the chief god of ancient Carthage and Numidia (Note: "Among the local iconographic particularities in Cuicul, Mons and Sitifis, Saturn and the deities of the Sun (Tafukt) and the Moon (Ayyur) are highly venerated and occupy the same register or are put on the same level."). He was a weather god considered responsible for the fertility of vegetation and esteemed as king of the gods. He was depicted as a bearded older man with curling ram's horns. Ba'al Ḥammon's female cult partner was Tanit. Ba'al Hammon was worshipped only in North Africa and Carthaginian colonies of the western mediterranean including Iberia, Sicily, Sardinia and the Balearic Islands.

In Carthage and North Africa, Baʿal Hammon was especially associated with the ram and was also worshiped as the horned deity Baʿal Qarnaim "Lord of the Two Horns", He had several temples in Volubilis, Cirta, Iol, Hippo Regius, Timgad and many others however his chief temple was in an open-air sanctuary at Jebel Boukornine ("the two-horned hill") across the bay from Carthage, in Tunisia.

== Etymology ==
The meaning of his first name "Ba'al" is identified as one of the Phoenician deities covered under the name of Ba'al. However, the meaning of his second name "Hammon" is a syncretic association with Ammon, the god of ancient Libya whose temple was in Siwa Oasis where the only oracle of Ammon remained in that part of the Libyan Desert all throughout the ages the word is morphologically related to the Amazigh word Amman (meaning water or waters) because it is plural and has no singular forms, the vowel at the beginning of the word is characteristic of both Amazigh language and Ancient Egyptian since both languages derive from the same Afro-Asiatic language group, some words that are derived from the root 'a m n' also include another Amazigh word, thammen (meaning honey) which is an important nutritional food for Amazigh people they often associate with their beliefs, a way of invoking honour to the deity Ammon for his blessings upon them, the human group or cult of Siwa referred to as 'Ammoniyyun' (Those who belong to Ammon). This connection to Ammon, makes it possible to equate Ba'al Hammon lord of the sky to either Zeus or Cronos. a famous nickname given to Ammon by ancient people was 'Ammon Lord of Libya' this suggests that the origin of Ammon is not Egyptian-Libyan but only Libyan (berber), this is further proven by the etymological origin of the name of the deity in connection to Tamazight, many other scholars have since expanded upon this conclusion after René's archeological findings referring to the deity in literature as 'the Libyan god Ammon' modern scholars such as the Hellenic scholar Wynne-Thomas also confirms the Libyan connection (Note: "During the fourth century BC there were public sacrifices in Athens to Zeus-Ammon, whose original cult was at the Siwa Oasis in Egypt."), the deity's Egyptian-Libyan origins are well established today.

Historians Crake & Walbank dismiss a claim that Hammon meaning "Brazier" in ugarit which implies that Ba'al Hammon is equated to Apollo which is a solar deity, the original author of this claim describes his own conclusions as "clearly very hypothetical".Frank Moore also dismisses a hypothesis based on arguments presented for a connection to Hamōn, the Ugaritic name for Mount Amanus, a peak in the Nur Mountains that separate Syria from Cilicia, this connection makes Ba'al Hammon a Moon god which the author sees as another reason why this connection is insufficient.

== Cult and attributes ==
=== Ancient Egypt ===
Ammon or Amun was an Ancient Egyptian deity adopted into Libyan Religion, whose oracle was situated in the Siwa oasis, in Siwa there remained a solitary oracle of Ammon near the Libyan Desert. 500 km west of Memphis, the capital of ancient Egypt, the oasis was also called Ammon.

A shrine was built by pharaoh Amasis, a political act, intended to gain support from the Libyan tribes that had played a decisive role during Amasis' accession. A similar motive may have been behind the second temple, built by Nectanebo II.

Amasis' sanctuary has been excavated on the acropolis, a shali hill now called Aghurmi, and is remarkable because it does not look like an Egyptian temple at all. In fact, the cult seems to have remained Libyan in nature, something that is more or less confirmed by the fact that the local ruler of the oasis is not depicted as Amasis' subject but as his equal.

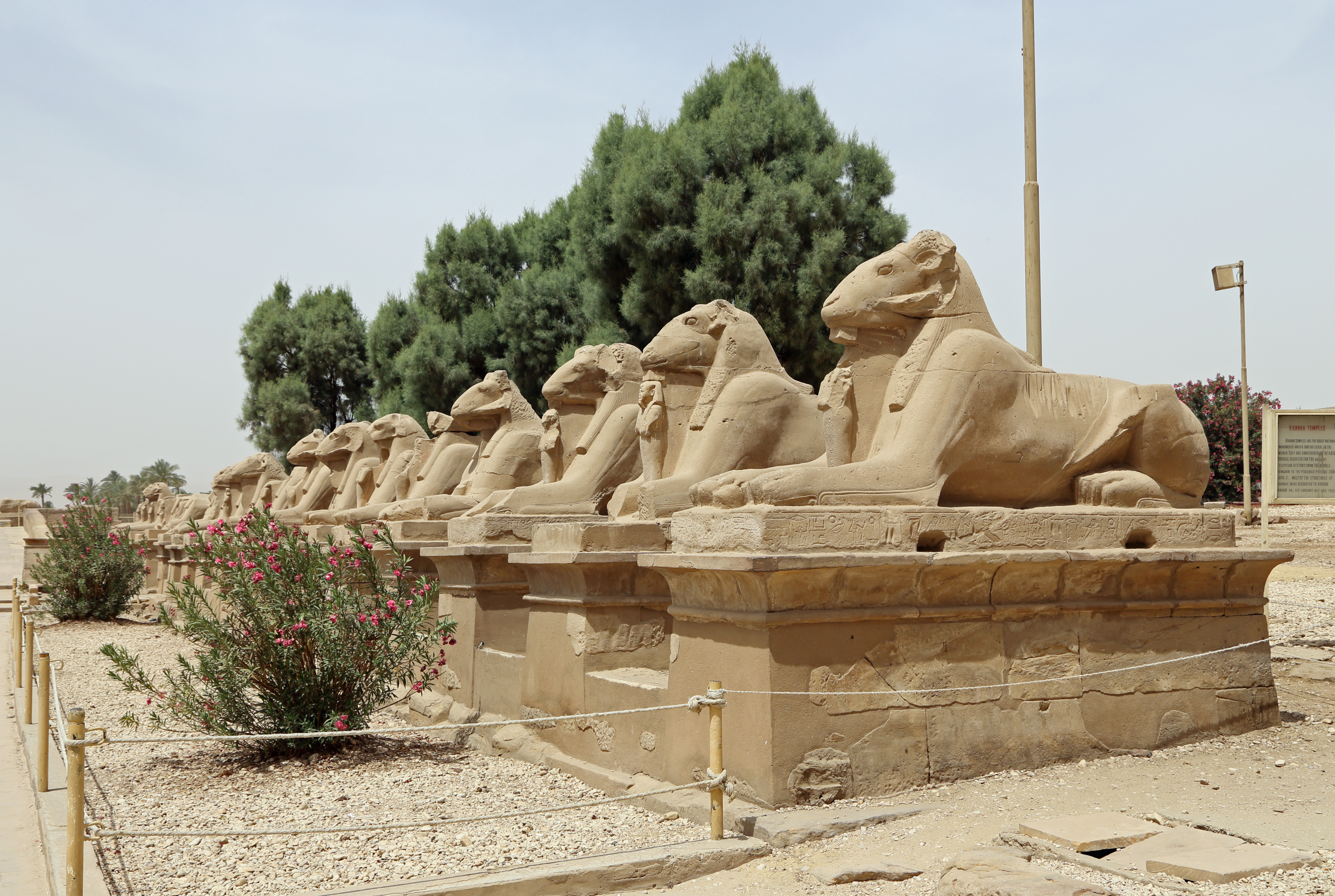
Ram headed sphynx or coriosphynx (Symbol of veneration of Ammon)

The worship of Ammon was introduced into Greece at an early period, probably through the medium of the Greek colony in Cyrene, which must have formed a connection with the great oracle of Ammon in the Oasis soon after its establishment. Iarbas, a mythological king of Libya, was also considered a son of Ammon, the Libyan people's worship for ram was widespread in Libya, this is how we obtain the famous symbol for this deity in Ancient Egypt (The ram headed Sphynx or the Coriosphynx)

=== Carthage ===
The worship of Baʿal Hammon flourished in the punic colony of Carthage. His supremacy among the Carthaginian gods is believed to date from the 8th century BC after relations between Carthage and Tyre were broken off at the time of the Battle of Himera (480 BC). After the 5th century Tanit soon eclipsed the more established cult of Ba'al Hammon was frequently listed before him on the monuments.

Ba'al Hammon was known as the Chief of the pantheon of Carthage and the deity that made vegetation grow; as with most deities of Carthage, he was seemingly propitiated with child sacrifice, likely in times of strife or crisis, or only by elites, perhaps for the good of the whole community. This practice was recorded by Greeks and Romans, but dismissed as propaganda by modern scholars, until archeologists unearthed urns containing the cremated remains of infants in places of ritual sacrifice. Some scholars believe this confirms the accounts of child sacrifice, while others insist these are the remains of children who died young.

He has been identified with a solar deity, although Yigael Yadin thought him to be a moon god. Edward Lipiński identifies him with the god Dagon. In Carthage and North Africa, Baʿal Hammon was especially associated with the ram and was also worshiped as the horned deity Baʿal Qarnaim "Lord of the Two Horns" in an open-air sanctuary at Jebel Boukornine ("the two-horned hill") across the bay from Carthage, in Tunisia.

The interpretatio graeca identified him with the Titan Cronus. In ancient Rome, he was identified with Saturn, and the cultural exchange between Rome and Carthage as a result of the Second Punic War may have influenced the development of the festival of Saturnalia.. Attributes of his Romanized form as an African Saturn indicate that Hammon (Amunus in Philo's work) was a fertility god.

==== Roman era Numidia ====
Dedications and art show Severan era resurgence, indicate the cult's importance even into the later Roman period.

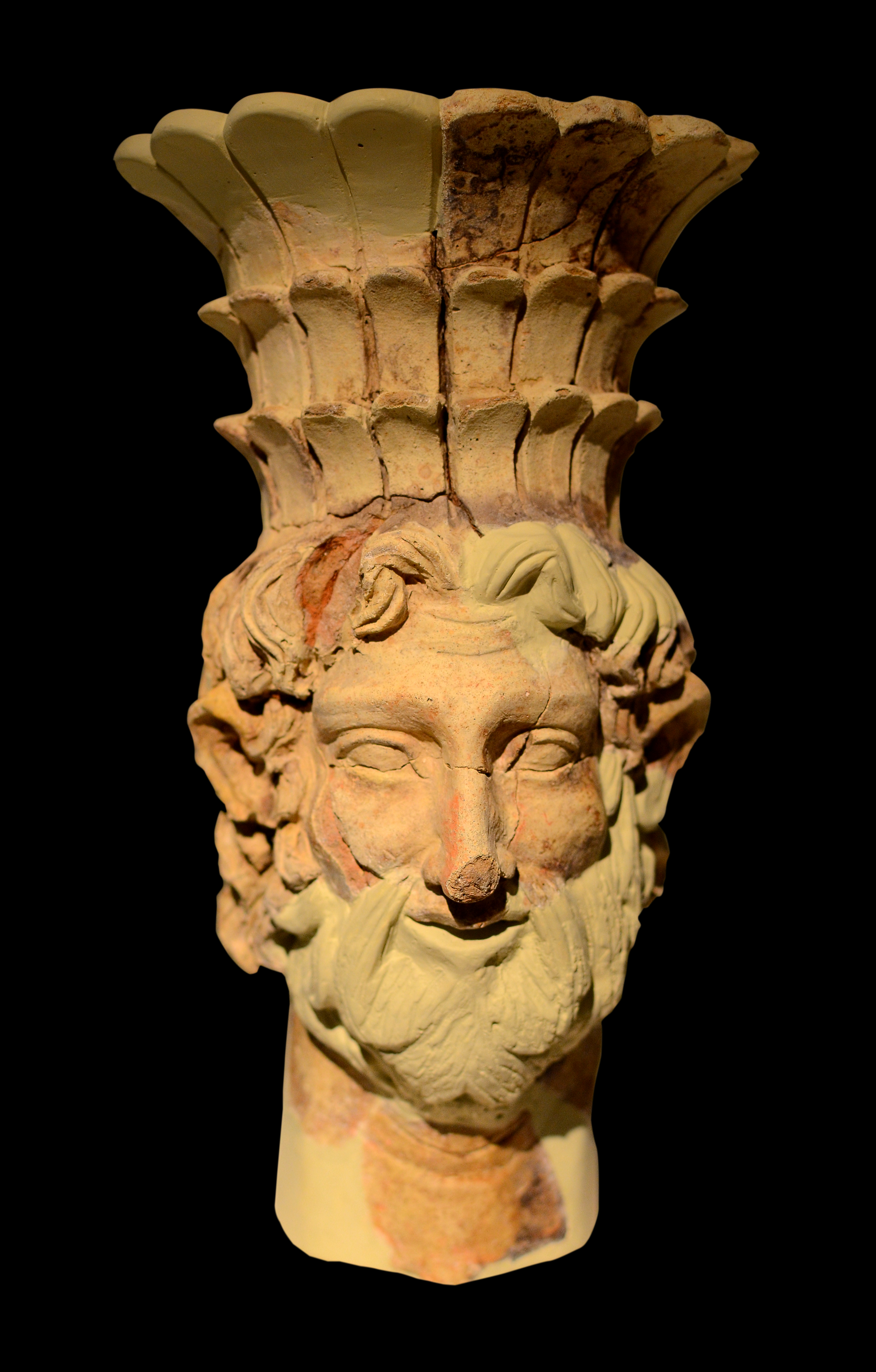
An incense burner depicting Ba'al-Hamon, 2nd century BC

== Early history ==
In 1910, the earliest archeology done by René Basset founded that the cult of Ammon first developed in ancient Libya before spreading to ancient Egypt a famous nickname given to Ammon by ancient people was 'Ammon Lord of Libya' this suggests that the origin of Ammon is not Egyptian-Libyan but only Libyan (berber), this is further proven by the etymological origin of the name, many other scholars have since expanded upon this conclusion after René's archeological findings referring to the deity in literature as 'the Libyan god Ammon' modern scholars such as the Hellenic scholar Wynne-Thomas also confirms the Libyan connection.

== Children of Ba'al Hammon ==
=== Gurzil ===
According to the 6th century AD author Corippus, a Libyan people known as the Laguatan carried an effigy of their god Gurzil, whom they believed to be the son of Ammon, into battle against the Byzantine Empire in the 540s AD.

=== Iarbas (Hiarbas) ===
In Roman mythology and Libyan mythology, Iarbas was the son of Jupiter-Hammon (Hammon was a North African god associated by the Romans with Jupiter, and known for his oracle) and a Garamantian nymph. Iarbas was said to have led an army across the Libyan desert, however he and his army began suffering from severe thirst. Iarbas implored his father Ammon for aid, the god sent him a ram (the animal of the god) and Iarbas and his army followed the ram to a location, where the ram struck his hooves to the ground and up sprang a water source. This is how the Libyans began attributing the animal to Ammon (Libyans origin of the cult of ram worship).

== Popular culture ==
Algerians and Tunisians refer to "Baali farming" to mean non-irrigated agriculture.

There is a survival in modern times in onomastics with some first names in use particularly in Tunisia grafted onto the name of the god. Algerian, Tunisian and many other spoken forms of Arabic refer to "Baali farming" to refer to non-irrigated agriculture. Such usage is attested in Hebrew, a Canaanite language sister to Phoenician, already in the 2nd century CE Mishnah.

A street in modern Carthage, located near the Punic Ports, bears the name of Ba'al Hammon.

The city of Carmona (Andalusia, Spain) is believed to derive its name from Kar-Hammon, "city of Hammon."

== Temples ==
178 temples have been discovered and listed for the deity in the following:

Region	Number of Temples	Most important Temples
Africa Proconsularis	118	Jebel Boukornine Hippo Regius
Numidia	35	Cirta Hippo Regius
Mauritania Caesarensis	25	Sitifis Djémila Timgad
Tripolitania	1	Leptis Magna

== See also ==
- Ba'al-zephon, the storm god of Jebel Aqra
- Punic religion
