= Hammam-Lif =

Town in Ben Arous Governorate, Tunisia

Hammam-Lif حمام الأنف
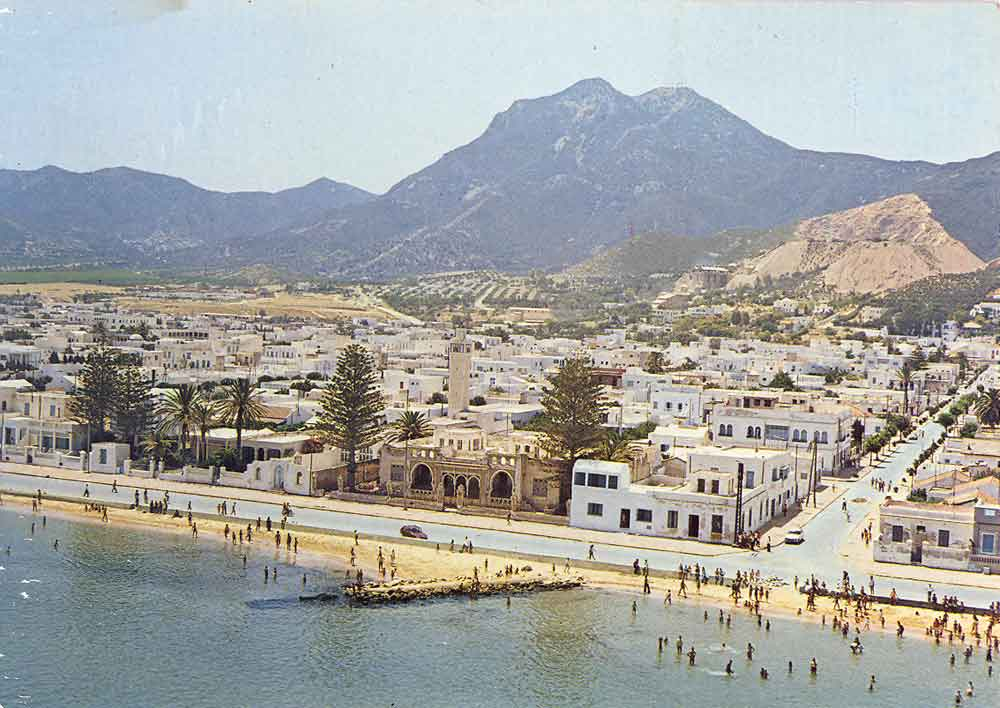

- Location in Tunisia
- Coordinates: 36°44′N 10°20′E
- Country: Tunisia
- Governorate: Ben Arous Governorate

Government
  - Mayor: Mohamed Ayari (Nidaa Tounes)

Population (2022)
  - Total: 44,207
- Time zone: UTC1 (CET)

Hammam-Lif (Arabic: حمام الأنف) is a coastal town about 20 km south-east of Tunis, the capital of Tunisia. It has been known since antiquity for its thermal springs originating in Mount Bou Kornine.

== History ==
The city was founded by Phoenicians at the foot of Jebel Boukornine. Its original name was Nar, meaning "fire" in Punic.

In 1883, the French captain Ernest De Prudhomme discovered in his Hammam-lif residence the ruins of an ancient synagogue that once stood in Hammam-Lif in the 3rd-5th century, when it was part of the province of Africa Byzacena. The is earliest known synagogue from North Africa.

Hammam-Lif was once the home of Italian, Greek and Jewish communities, especially before the end of the French colonial period.

Hammam-Lif's most interesting site is probably Dar El Bey, which was the residence of Ali II Bey, the 4th bey of Tunis.

== Sport ==
The local football team Club Sportif de Hammam-Lif won the Tunisian championship in 1952, 1954, 1955, 1956 and the Tunisian Cup in 1946, 1947, 1948, 1949, 1950, 1985 and 2001.

== Notable people ==
- Ahmed Achour (1945–2021), conductor and composer
- Wajiha Jendoubi (born 1960), actress and comedian
- Aly Ben Ayed (1930–1972), actor and director
- Férid Boughedir (born 1944), film director and screenwriter
- Abdelmajid Lakhal (1939–2014), film actor and theater director
- Témime Lahzami (born 1949), football player
- Selma Baccar (born 1945), filmmaker and producer
- Leila Toubel (born 1962), playwright and theater director
- Mouna Noureddine (born 1937), actress
- Noureddine Kasbaoui (1931–1996), actor and director
- Walid Mattar (born 1980), film director

== Population ==
2014 Census (Municipal)
Homes	Families	Males	Females	Total
14,032	11,634	20,615	21,903	42,518

== See also ==
- Boukornine National Park
