= Korbous =

Coordinates: 36°49′N 10°34′E

Korbous قُرْبُص Qurbus
- Commune and town
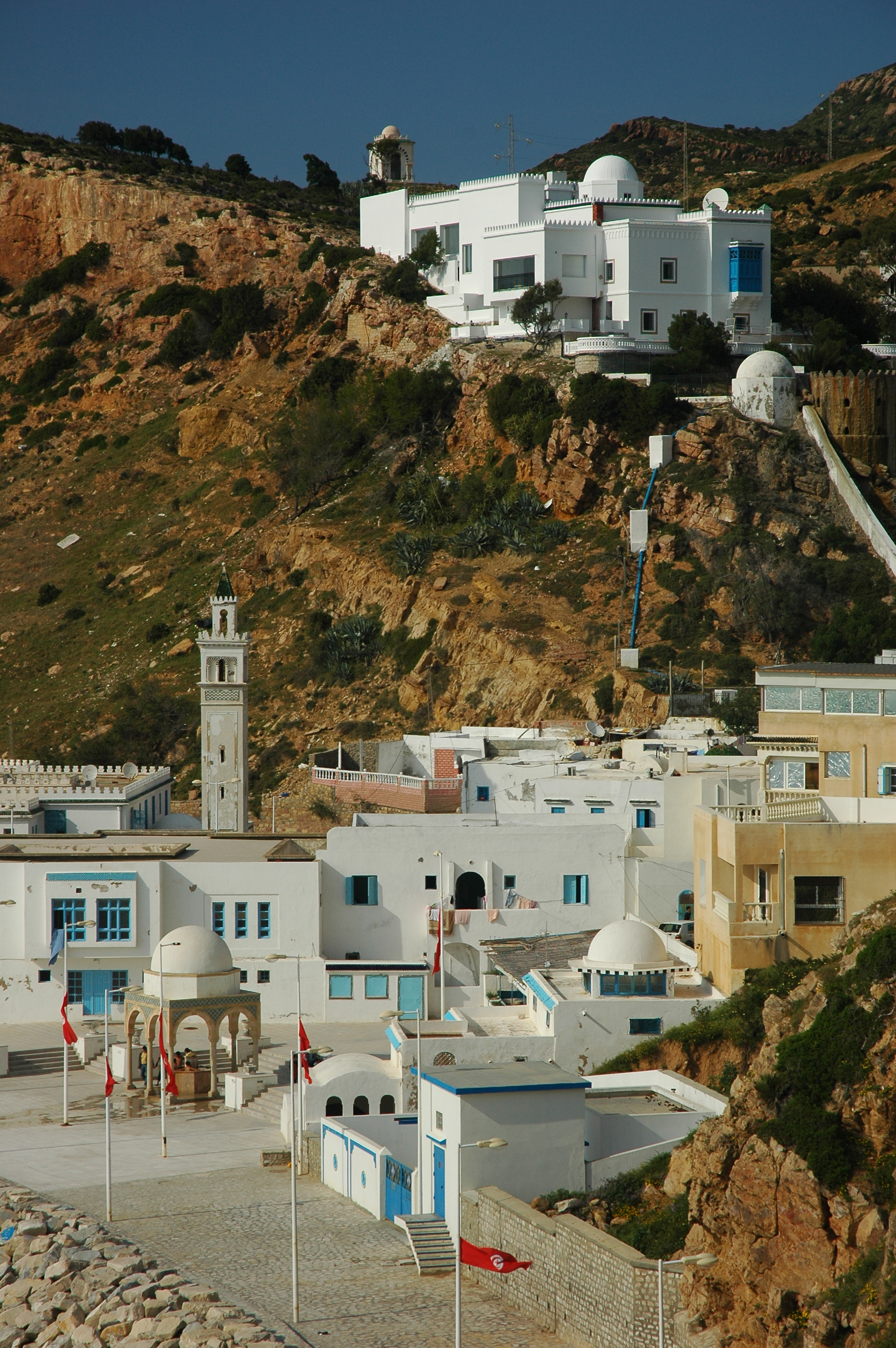
- Interactive map of Korbous
- Country: Tunisia
- Governorate: Nabeul Governorate
- Elevation: 3.3 ft (1 m)

Population (2014)
  - Total: 3,532
- Time zone: UTC+1 (CET)
- Postal code: 8041

Korbous (Arabic: قُرْبُص, romanized: qurbuṣ) is a town and commune in the Nabeul Governorate, Tunisia. As of 2004 it had a population of 3,551.

Korbous lies on the Cap Bon peninsula and is set in a deep ravine that opens to the sea near the village of Sidi Rais. Surrounded by the Qorbus Forest, the area has been popular as a health resort since Roman times.

== History ==
Built on a mountainside along a single street, the place was frequented by the Romans of Carthage, who came here by boat and called it Aquae Calideae Carpitanae (Eaux de Carpis), due to the hot springs rising to more than 50°C, as evidenced by the many Roman remains and an inscription now on display at the Bardo National Museum.

Fallen into oblivion, the site was only frequented by a local population after the Arab conquest. But in the 19th century, Ahmed Ier Bey gave it a new lease of life by building a pavilion that is now the town's hammam. In spite of its fame as a health resort, Korbous remains quiet and unassuming, but there are now (2016) plans to build a large spa with marina and luxury hotels.

In addition to the steam and water treatments, mud from nearby Aïn Kanassira is used, especially for the treatment of dermal diseases, rheumatism, arthritis and certain nervous system diseases.

== See also ==
- El Brij, Tunisia
- Kerkouane
- List of cities in Tunisia
