= Boukornine National Park =

National park in Tunisia

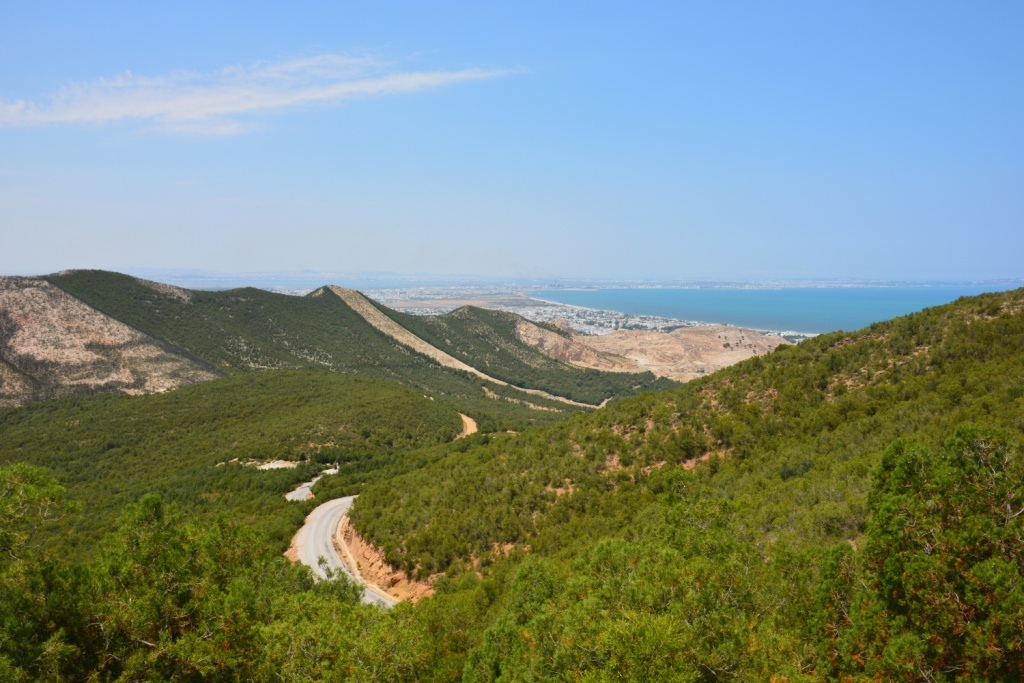

- Location within Tunisia
- Location: Tunisia
- Coordinates: 36.68796690°N 10.38824307°E
- Area: 19.39 km^{2} (7.49 sq mi)
- Established: 1987

Boukornine National Park (French: Parc national de Boukornine) is a national park in northern Tunisia.

The 1,939-hectare (4,790-acre) park was established on 12 February 1987. It is near the town of Hammam-Lif and just 15 kilometres (9.3 mi) to the capital city of Tunis.

The park is home to flowers like the Persian cyclamen and animals like the Etruscan shrew (the world's smallest known mammal) and the Mountain gazelle.

The park is the site of Jebel Boukornine (a 576-metre mountain) and the Aïn Zargua spring, as well as an ecomuseum.
