= Cape Bon =

Peninsula in northeastern Tunisia

- Peninsula
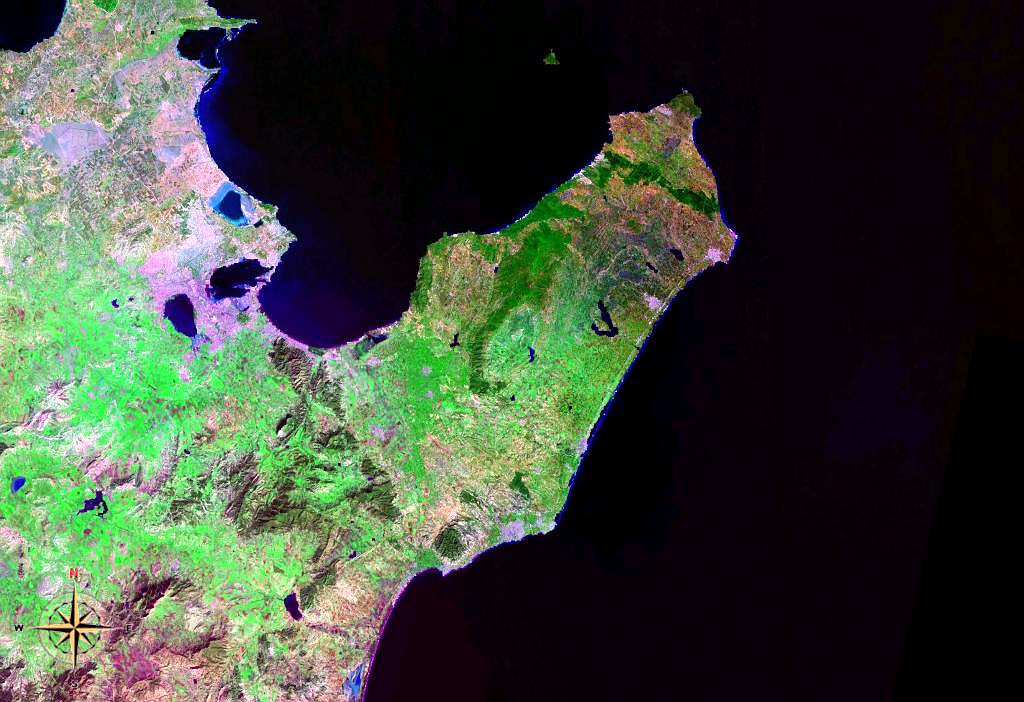
- Cape Bon from space (false color)

- Location within Tunisia
- Coordinates: 36°45′N 10°45′E
- Location: Nabeul Governorate, Tunisia

Cape Bon ("Good Cape"), also known as Res et-Teib or Ra's at Tib (Arabic: الرأس الطيب), Shrīk Peninsula, or Watan el Kibli, is a peninsula in far northeastern Tunisia. Cape Bon is also the name of the northernmost point on the peninsula, also known as Res ed-Der, and known in antiquity as the Cape of Mercury (Latin: Promontorium Mercurii; Ancient Greek: Ερμαία ἄκρα) or Cape Hermaeum.

== Peninsula ==
A French topological map, showing the Cape Bon peninsula and cape along the southern shore of the Gulf of Tunis

The peninsula's northern shore forms the southern end of the Gulf of Tunis, while its southern shore is on the Gulf of Hammamet.

The peninsula is administered as the country's Nabeul Governorate.

Settlements on the peninsula include Nabeul, Hammam el ghezaz, El Haouaria, Kelibia, Menzel Temime, Korba, and Beni Khalled. Rivers include the Melah and Chiba wadis. Mountains include Kef Bou Krim (237 m or 778 ft), Kef er-Rend (637 m or 2,090 ft), Djebel Sidi Abd er-Rahmane (602 m or 1,975 ft), Djebel Hofra (421 m or 1,381 ft), and Djebel Reba el-Aine (328 m or 1,076 ft). Besides Cape Bon, other headlands on the peninsula are Ras Dourdas and Ras el-Fortass on the northern shore, Ras el-Melah on the short eastern shore, and Ras Mostefa and Ras Maamoura on the southern shore.

The ruins of the Punic town Kerkouane are also located here. Djebel Mlezza ("Mount Mlessa") has tombs from the time of Agathocles, which were excavated just before the First World War.

== See also ==
- Battles of Cape Bon in 468 and in 1941
- El Brij, Tunisia
- Sidi Rais
- Korbous
