= Leila Toubel =

Tunisian screenwriter, actress, playwright, and cultural activist

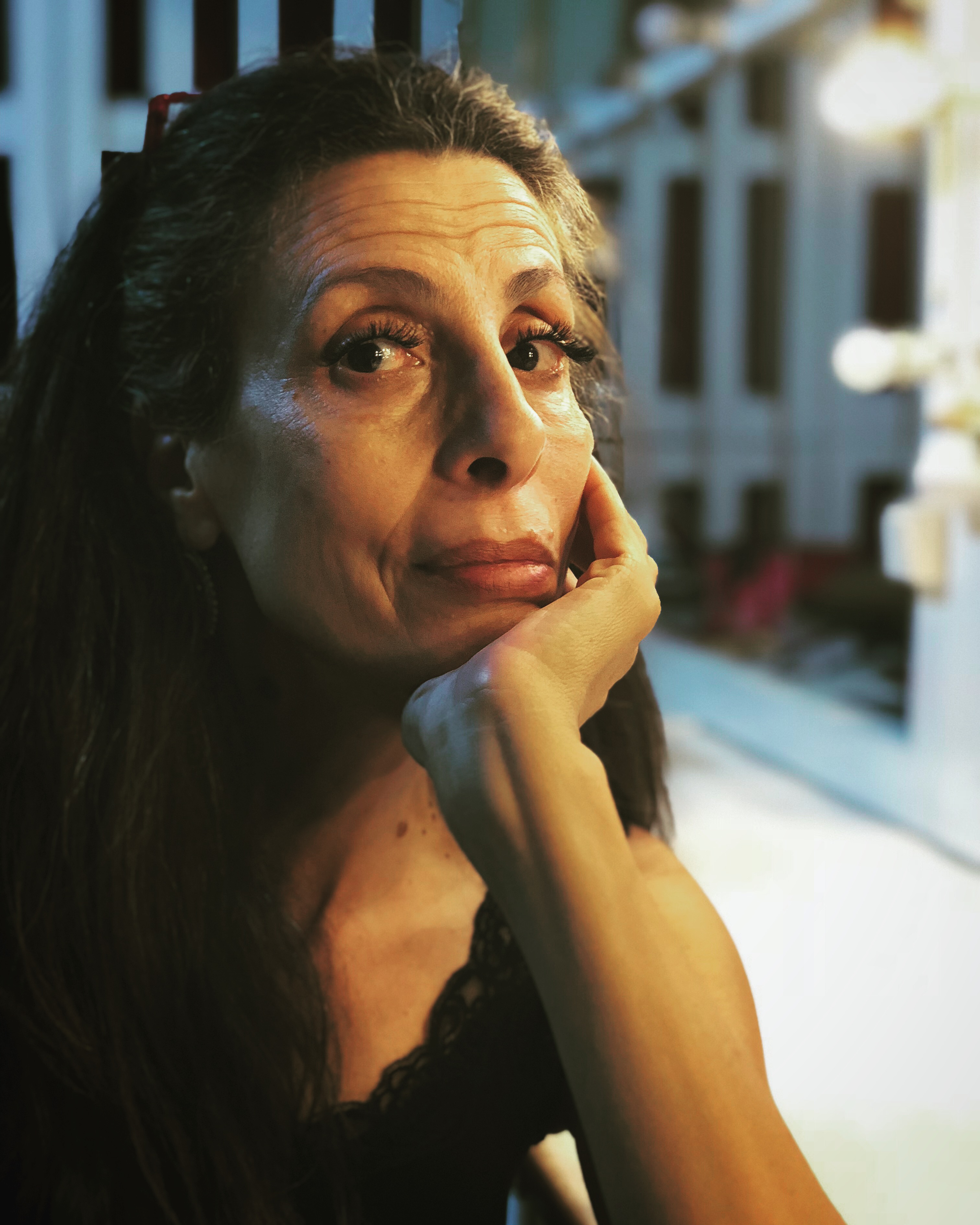
- Born: 1962 (age 63–64); Hammam Lif, Tunisia
- Occupations: Playwright, actress, screenwriter, theatre director, festival director
- Years active: 1990–present
- Known for: Leading figure in contemporary Tunisian theatre; works on social justice and women's rights

Leila Toubel (born 1962, Hammam Lif, Tunisia) is a Tunisian playwright, actress, screenwriter, and theatre director. She is recognized as one of the leading figures in contemporary Tunisian theatre, known for her bold, socially engaged works that address issues such as women's rights, freedom of expression, and political change.

== Early life ==
Toubel began writing poetry and short stories from a young age and was involved in school theatre from age thirteen. Her professional career was launched in 1990 after an audition at the El Hamra Theatre in Tunis, where she began a long creative partnership with director Ezzedine Gannoun.

== Theater works ==
Toubel’s body of work includes acting, writing, and directing for the stage. Her plays are known for their incisive exploration of Tunisian society, especially in the aftermath of the 2011 revolution. Notable works include:

- Monstranum's (2013): Written by Toubel and directed by Ezzedine Gannoun, this play uses allegory to depict post-revolutionary Tunisia, exploring themes of power, corruption, and collective memory.
- Solwen (2015): A monodrama produced by Toubel’s company Resist'Art, addressing socio-political realities in post-revolution Tunisia, including critiques of patriarchy and obscurantism.
- Hourya (2016): A music-theatre piece about terrorism and impossible love, performed internationally, including at UNESCO in Paris.
- Yakouta (2021): A monodrama focusing on the condition of women, gender-based violence, and the struggle for emancipation; it has been performed in Tunisia and Europe and won the “Massrah Ensemble pour l'écriture théâtrale” award.
- Ad Vitam (2023): A return to ensemble theatre, this poetic and metaphor-rich play explores themes of memory, nature, and the fragility of existence.

== Artistic and social engagement ==
Toubel is known for using theater as a platform for resistance and civic engagement, especially regarding freedom of expression and women’s rights. She directed the Boukornine Festival and has served on juries for major cultural events, including the Journées Théâtrales de Carthage.

In 2020, she launched the project Dream's Chebeb, supporting young artists across Tunisia’s 24 governorates in theater, dance, video, photography, and music, with the aim of empowering youth and decentralizing cultural production.

== Political involvement ==
In 2022, Toubel was invited as an independent artist to participate in President Kais Saied’s National Consultative Committee for drafting a new Tunisian constitution. She emphasized her independence from political parties and her commitment to freedom of expression.

== Legacy ==
Leila Toubel is widely regarded as a pioneering figure in Tunisian and Arab theatre, celebrated for her fearless engagement with contemporary issues and her mentorship of younger generations of artists.
