= Djebel Ressas =

Mountain in Tunisia

- Jebel Ressas
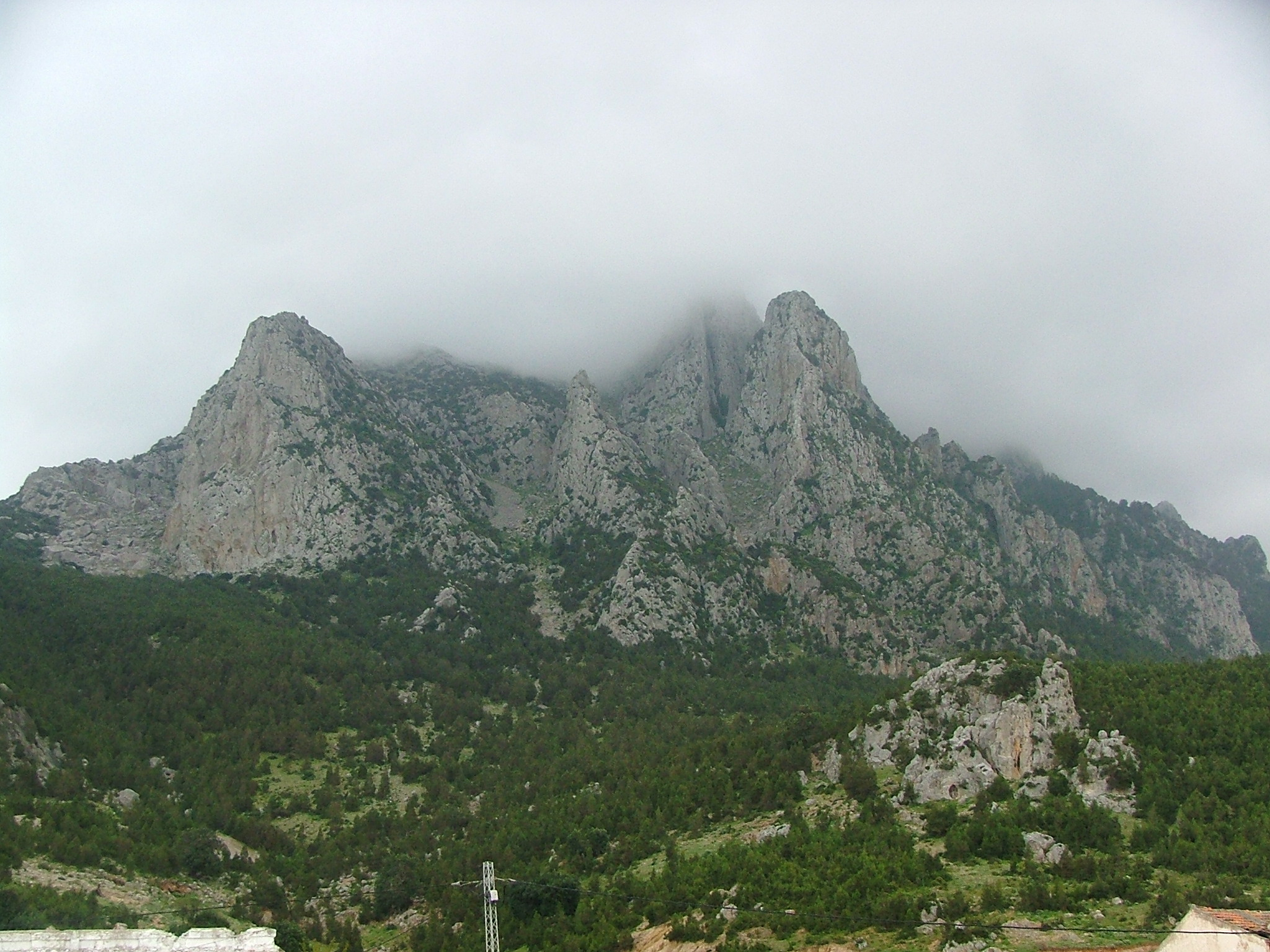
- Djebel Ressas in cloud cover, as viewed from the northwest

Highest point
- Elevation: 795 m (2,608 ft)
- Coordinates: 36°36′N 10°20′E

Naming
- English translation: mountain of lead
- Language of name: Tunisian Arabic

Geography
- Location within Tunisia
- Location: Tunisia

Geology
- Mountain type: Limestone

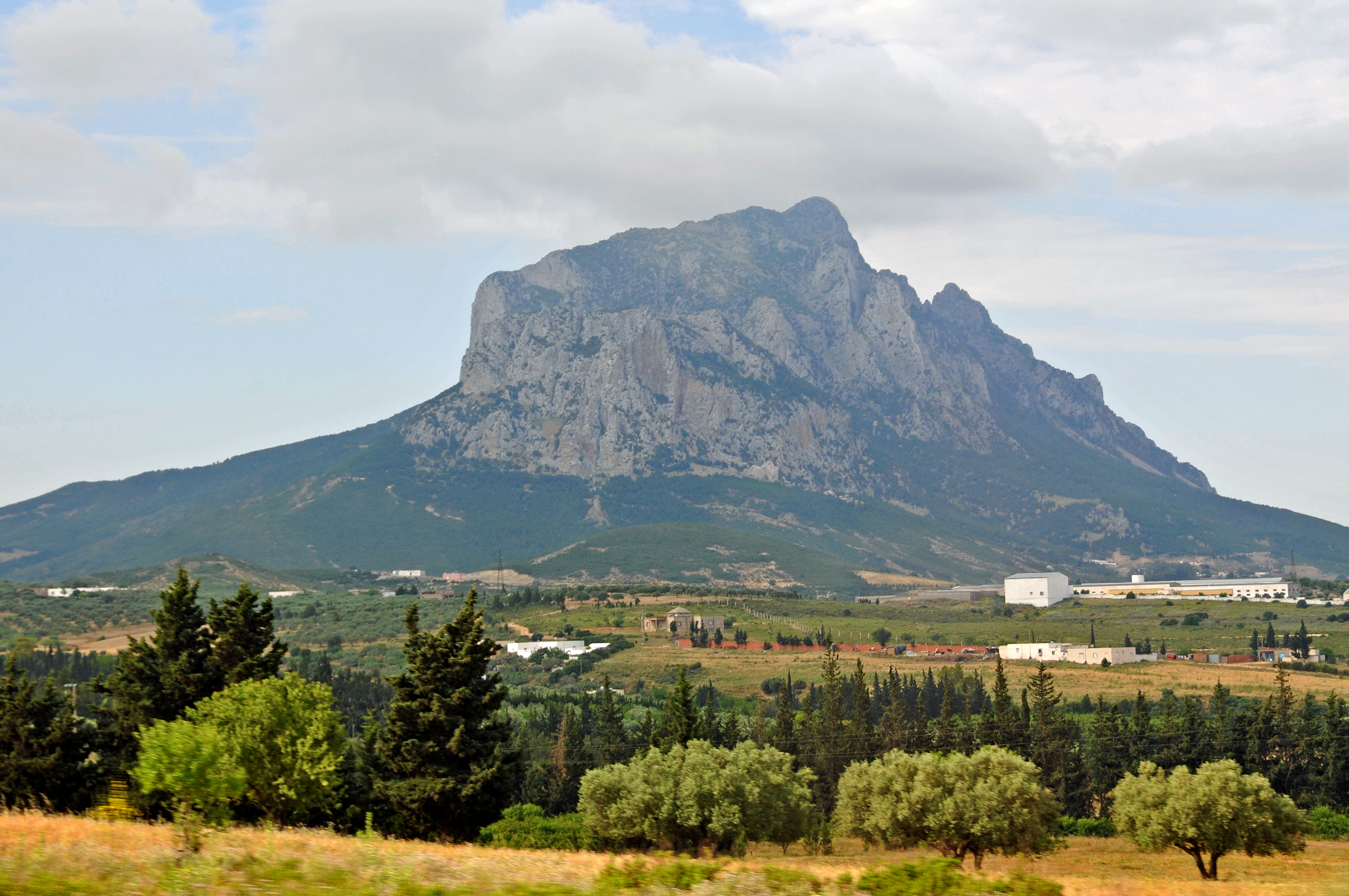
Djebel Ressas viewed from the highway into Sousse

Djebel Ressas is a high and rugged outcropping of Jurassic limestone situated on the horizon southeast of Tunis, Tunisia. Competing in the foreground, the familiar profile of Djebel Boukornine may appear taller, but at 795 metres Ressas is the dominant peak. Along the highway between Tunis and Hammamet there are excellent views of the mountain as one looks south from near the tollbooths, just past the exit to Mornag.

== Geology ==
The geologic origins of Djebel Ressas and the neighboring peaks date to earlier than 100 million years ago. The surrounding region was then a vast and swampy tropical area abundant with life. The large carnivorous dinosaurs Spinosaurus aegyptiacus hunted nearby in what is currently the Sahara desert in southern Tunisia.

Meanwhile, just to the north, minuscule prehistoric animals, known as radiolarians, dwelt in a primordial sea that eventually became today's Mediterranean. Covering much of what we now call the Maghreb of northern Africa, masses of these shelled microorganisms inhabited that exotic marine environment, depositing their tiny crusty carcasses on the bottom as they died. Countless layers of their organic remains were compacted and cemented into limestone, eventually forming the base of the ancient seafloor and ultimately providing the limestone fabric for a future mountain range.

Over eons, tectonic forces laterally compressed southern regions of this sedimentary basement, thrusting the seafloor upward along contorted faults and displacing the sea northward to its present shoreline. The Atlas Mountains gradually wrinkled their way across the northern, leading edge of Africa, with Ressas at the northeastern terminus of the range.

== Human history ==
Earliest references in literature indicate the countryside adjacent to Djebel Ressas was possibly the location of a famous military engagement, fought and won decisively by the empire of Carthage against rebel mercenaries and other local enemies, late in the 2nd century BC. Known as the Battle of "The Saw", the event is historically significant for the 40,000 lives it claimed.

During the Second World War, the mountain was effectively defended by an isolated German artillery unit until the very end of that conflict in north Africa in May 1943.

In the modern day, Djebel Ressas is largely used for agriculture. Most of the mountain is a quiet host to olive orchards and small herds of domestic livestock. The nearby town of Mornag has become the capital of a flourishing wine-producing region.

In Tunisian Arabic, the name Djebel Ressas literally means ‘mountain of lead’, a reference to the ore that was mined there, perhaps from Roman times until the late 19th or early 20th century. The southeastern slopes of the djebel still support an active rock and gravel quarry. Materials from this site are used to produce cement and stone matter for meeting the demands of Tunisia's rapidly expanding road systems and building infrastructure.

== General orientation ==
Most of Djebel Ressas is now well suited for recreation. But the site has not been developed formally as a recreational attraction. Perhaps that's partly due to its official status as a "nature preserve".
