= Gulf of Tunis =

Mediterranean bay in north-eastern Tunisia

Coordinates: 37°0′N 10°30′E

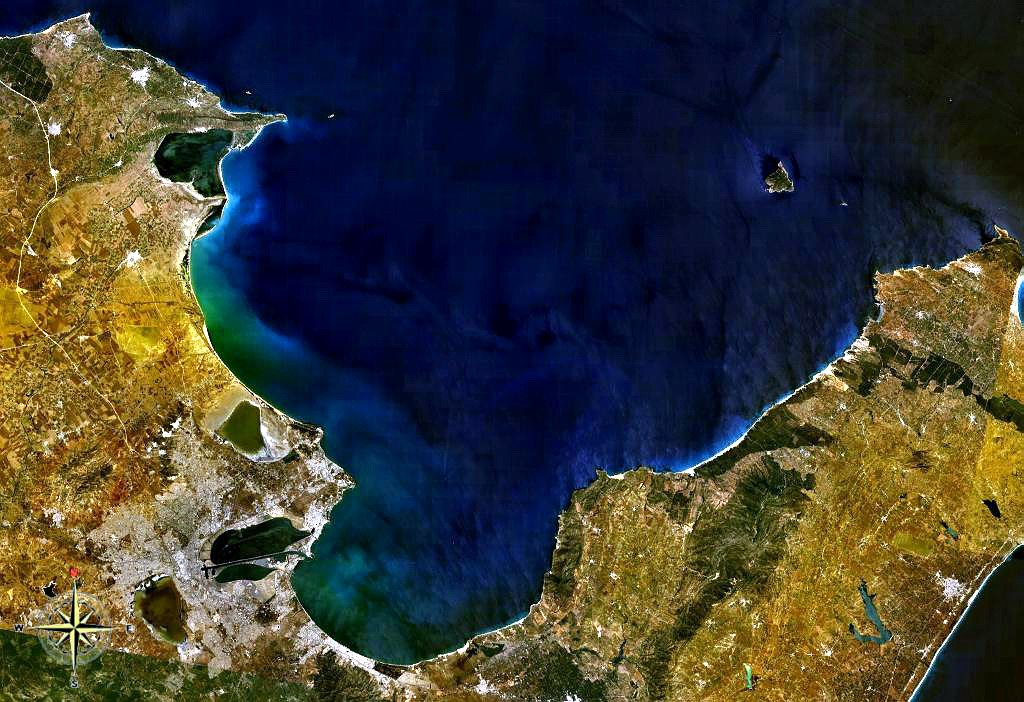
Gulf of Tunis seen from space

Topographic map of the Gulf of Tunis

The Gulf of Tunis (Tunisian Arabic: خليج تونس) is a large Mediterranean bay in north-eastern Tunisia, extending for 39 miles (63 km) from Cape Farina in the west to Cape Bon in the east. Tunis, the capital city of Tunisia, lies at the south-western edge of the Gulf, as have a series of settled places over the last three millennia. Djebel Ressas rises to 795 metres (2,608 ft) around 15 kilometres (9.3 mi) south of the southern edge of the Gulf.

The central part of the gulf, corresponding to the city of Tunis, is favorable to the implementation of a commercial port due to its location of being a well protected area. The famous city of Carthage was built on the gulf shores.
