= Kerkouane =

Archaeological site in Tunisia

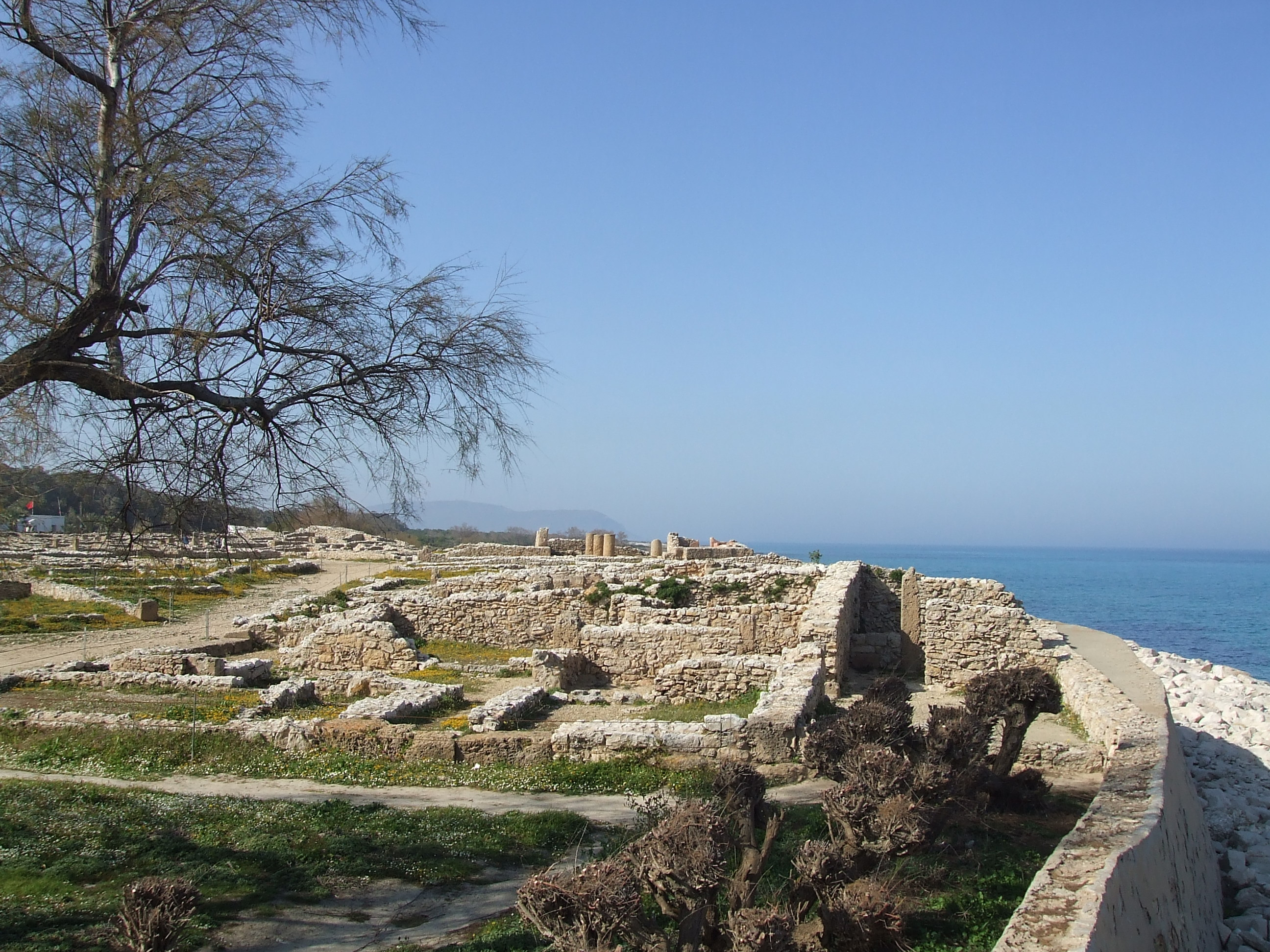

- Location within Tunisia
- 36.946389°N 11.099167°E
- Location: Nabeul Governorate, Tunisia

UNESCO World Heritage Site
- Official name: Punic Town of Kerkuane and its Necropolis
- Type: Cultural
- Criteria: iii
- Designated: 1985 (9th session)
- Reference no.: 332
- UNESCO Region: Arab States

Kerkouane or Kerkuane (Arabic: كركوان, Karkwān) is the site of an ancient Punic city in north-eastern Tunisia, near Cape Bon. Kerkouane was one of the most important Punic cities, with Carthage, Hadrumetum (modern Sousse), and Utica. This Phoenician city was probably abandoned during the First Punic War (c. 250 BC) and was not rebuilt by the Romans. It had existed for almost 400 years.

UNESCO declared the Punic town of Kerkouane and its necropolis a World Heritage Site in 1985, citing among other things that the remains constitute the only example of a Phoenicio-Punic city to have survived.

The name Kerkouane was given to the town by archaeologists. Its name in antiquity has not been preserved in any known historical documents.

== Etymology ==
The name Kerkouane is a Libyco-Berber toponym deriving from Berber kkerker "to wall up", it is also found in Algeria and the Sahel region.

== Excavations ==
Kerkouane is a small town and was probably never home to more than 1,200 people, mostly fishermen and craftsmen. Based on the presence of many murex shells, it would appear that the town produced purple dye, in addition to salt and garum (a food product).

Excavations of the town have revealed ruins and coins from the 4th and 3rd centuries BC. Around the site where the layout is clearly visible, many houses still show their walls, and the coloured clay on the facades is often still visible. The town was built on a grid with wide streets and public squares. The houses were built to a standard plan, in accordance with a sophisticated notion of town planning.

Traces of red ochre found in excavated tombs are common also to native Libyan burial customs, but the religious and architectural traditions of the town are predominantly of Carthaginian style. A black-figure wine jug decorated with a scene from The Odyssey found with an Ionian cup, and Greek architectural elements like peristyle courtyards and stucco plaster decorations found among the remains of upscale private homes, show the town was influenced by the culture of the greater Mediterranean world.

A sanctuary has some columns preserved, and in a small atrium parts of mosaics are found. Curbstones, doorsteps, thresholds, and floors of simple mosaic layers are found all over the ruins.

There is an area for ritual banquets and a sacrificial altar. While archaeologists are unsure precisely which deities the temple was dedicated to, they speculate based on artifacts found at the site that it may have been Melqart, Sid and Tanit. Terracotta heads showing two males wearing conical hats resemble Sid and Melqart iconography known from the Temple of Antas in Sardinia.

== Climate change ==
Due to its coastal location, Kerkouane is vulnerable to sea level rise. In 2022, the IPCC Sixth Assessment Report included it in the list of African cultural sites which would be threatened by flooding and coastal erosion by the end of the century, but only if climate change followed RCP 8.5, which is the scenario of high and continually increasing greenhouse gas emissions associated with the warming of over 4 °C., and is no longer considered very likely. The other, more plausible scenarios result in lower warming levels and consequently lower sea level rise: yet, sea levels would continue to increase for about 10,000 years under all of them. Even if the warming is limited to 1.5 °C, global sea level rise is still expected to exceed 2–3 m (7–10 ft) after 2000 years (and higher warming levels will see larger increases by then), consequently exceeding 2100 levels of sea level rise under RCP 8.5 (~0.75 m (2 ft) with a range of 0.5–1 m (2–3 ft)) well before the year 4000. Thus, it is a matter of time before Kerkouane is threatened by rising water levels, unless it can be protected by adaptation efforts such as sea walls.

== See also ==
- Sanctuary of Thinissut

== Gallery ==
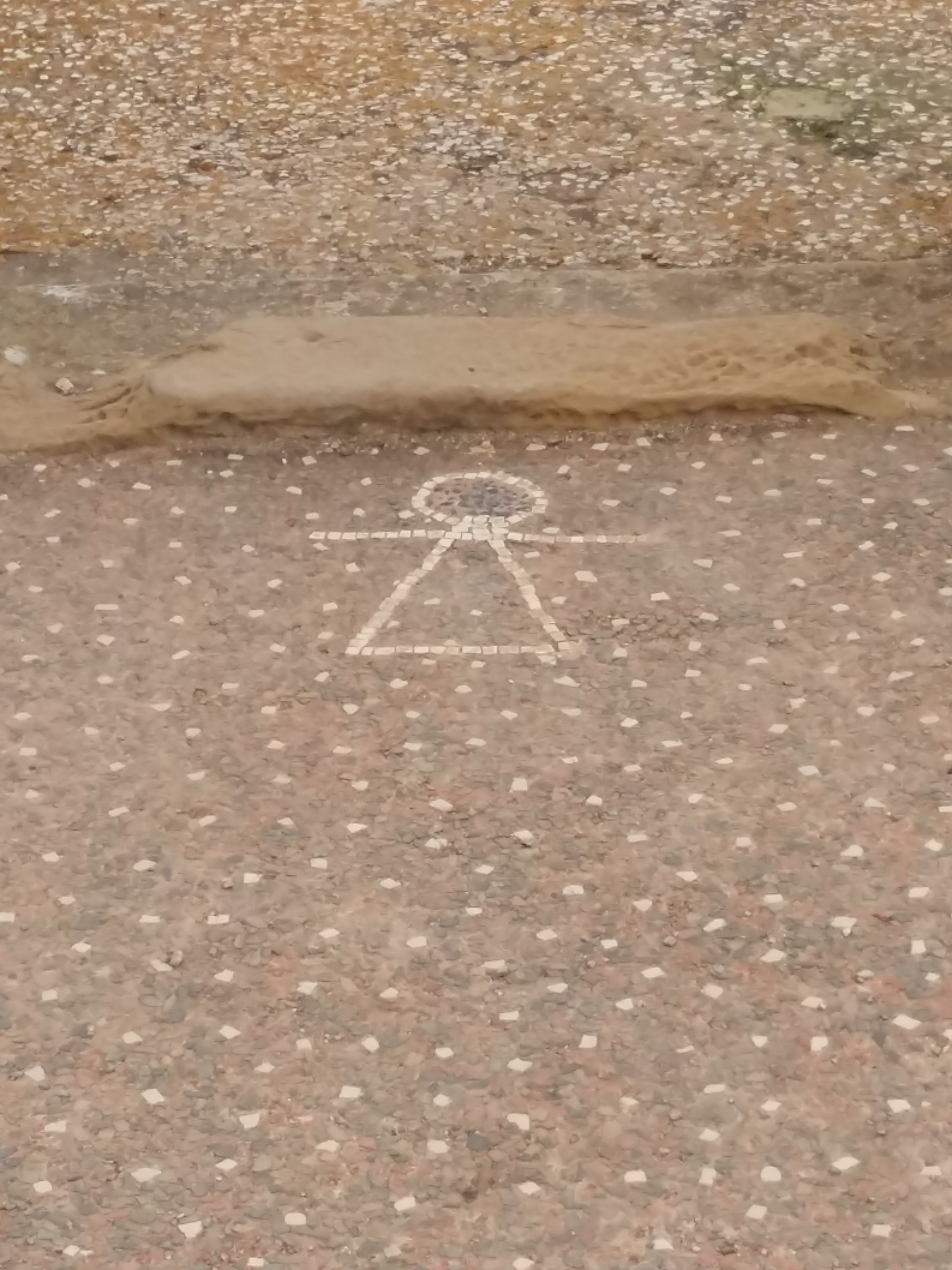
Floor of Kerkouane

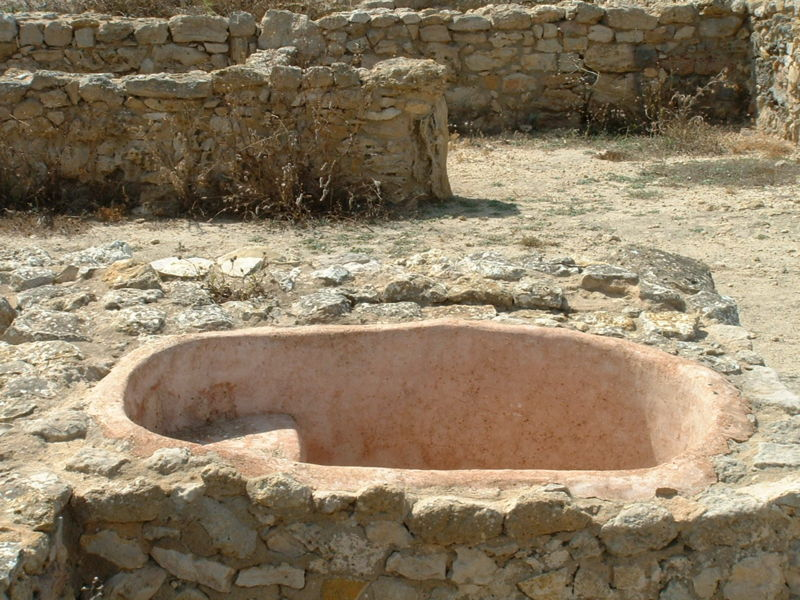
A bath

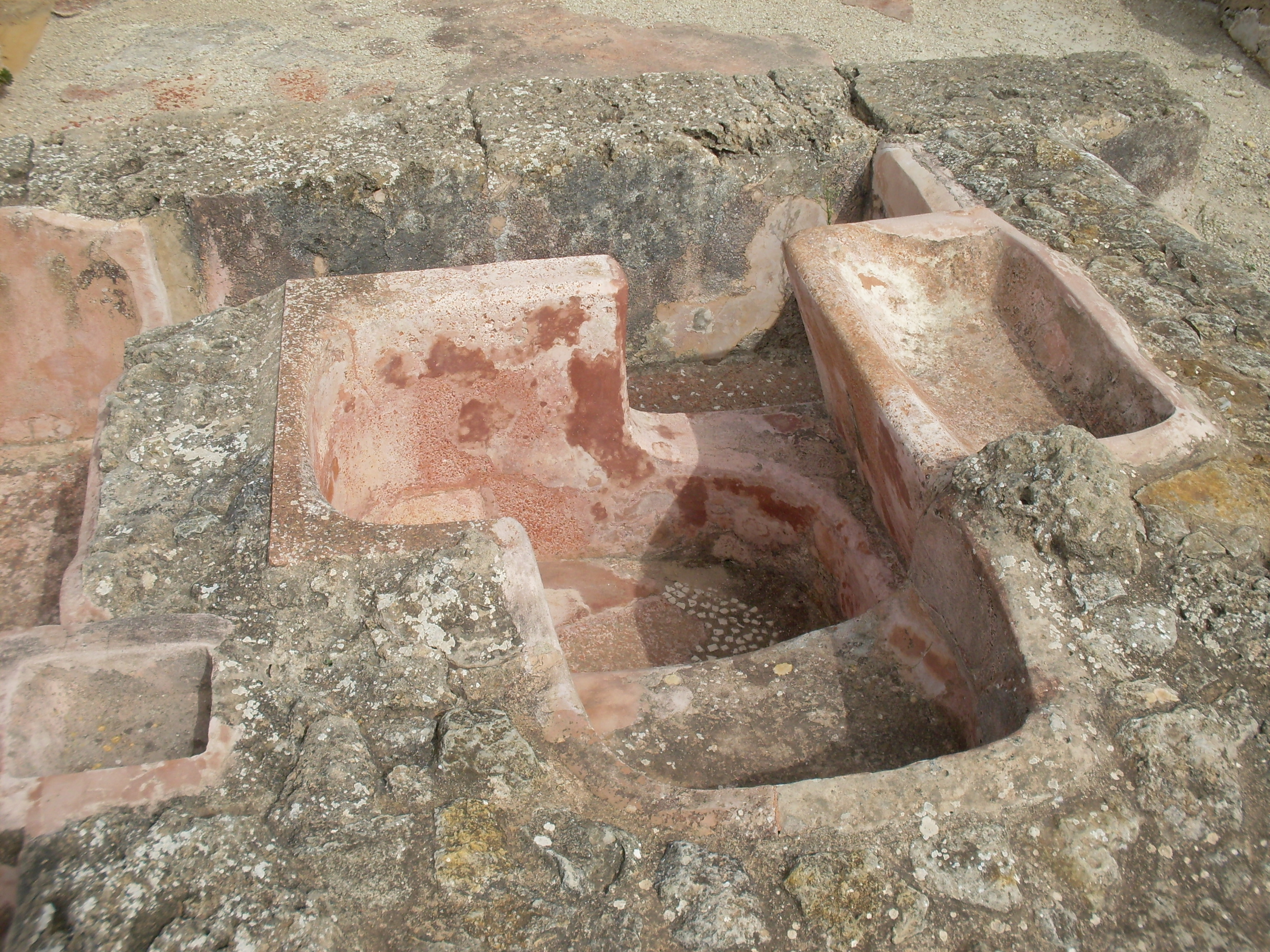
A toilet

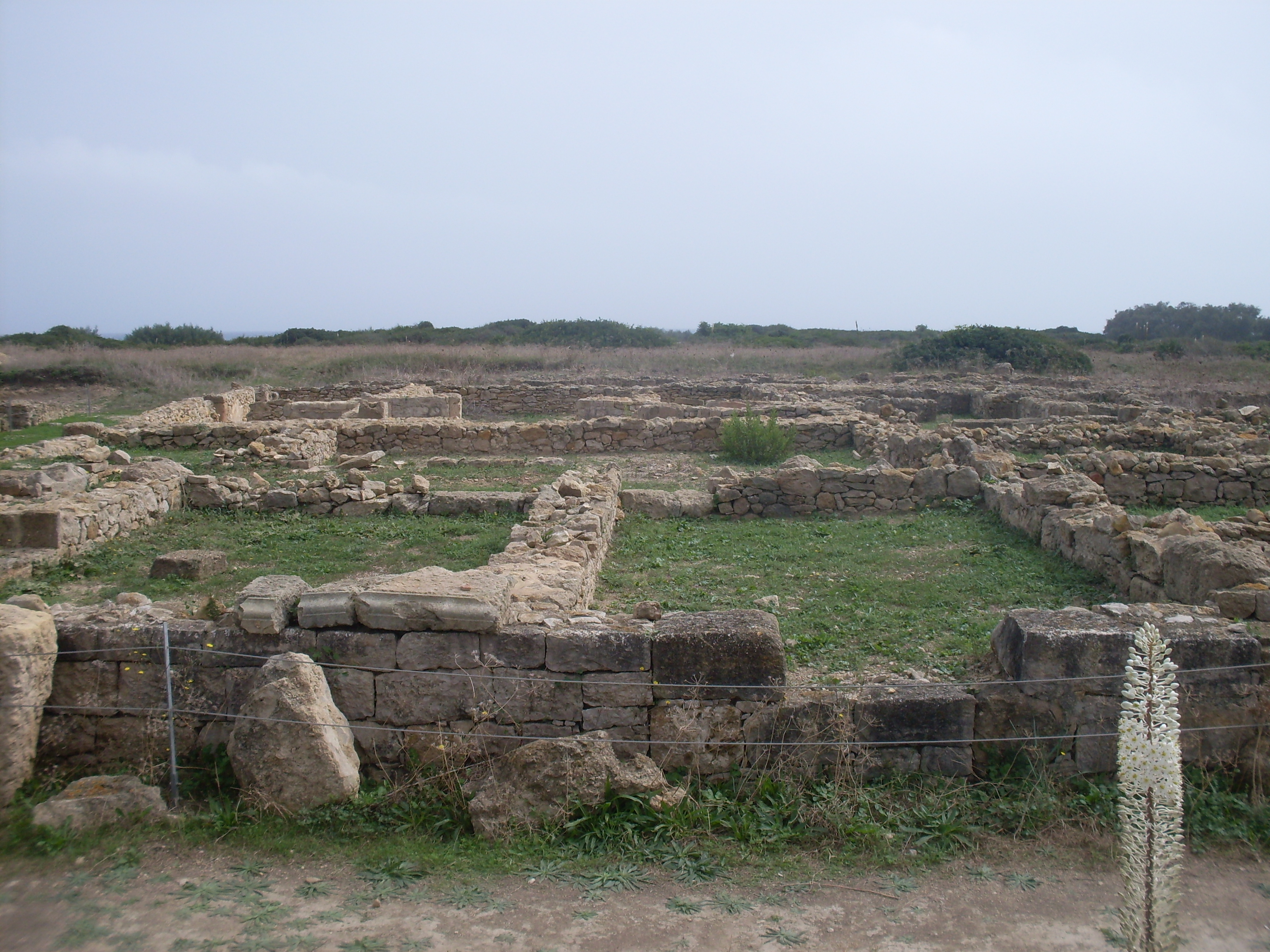
Remains of houses

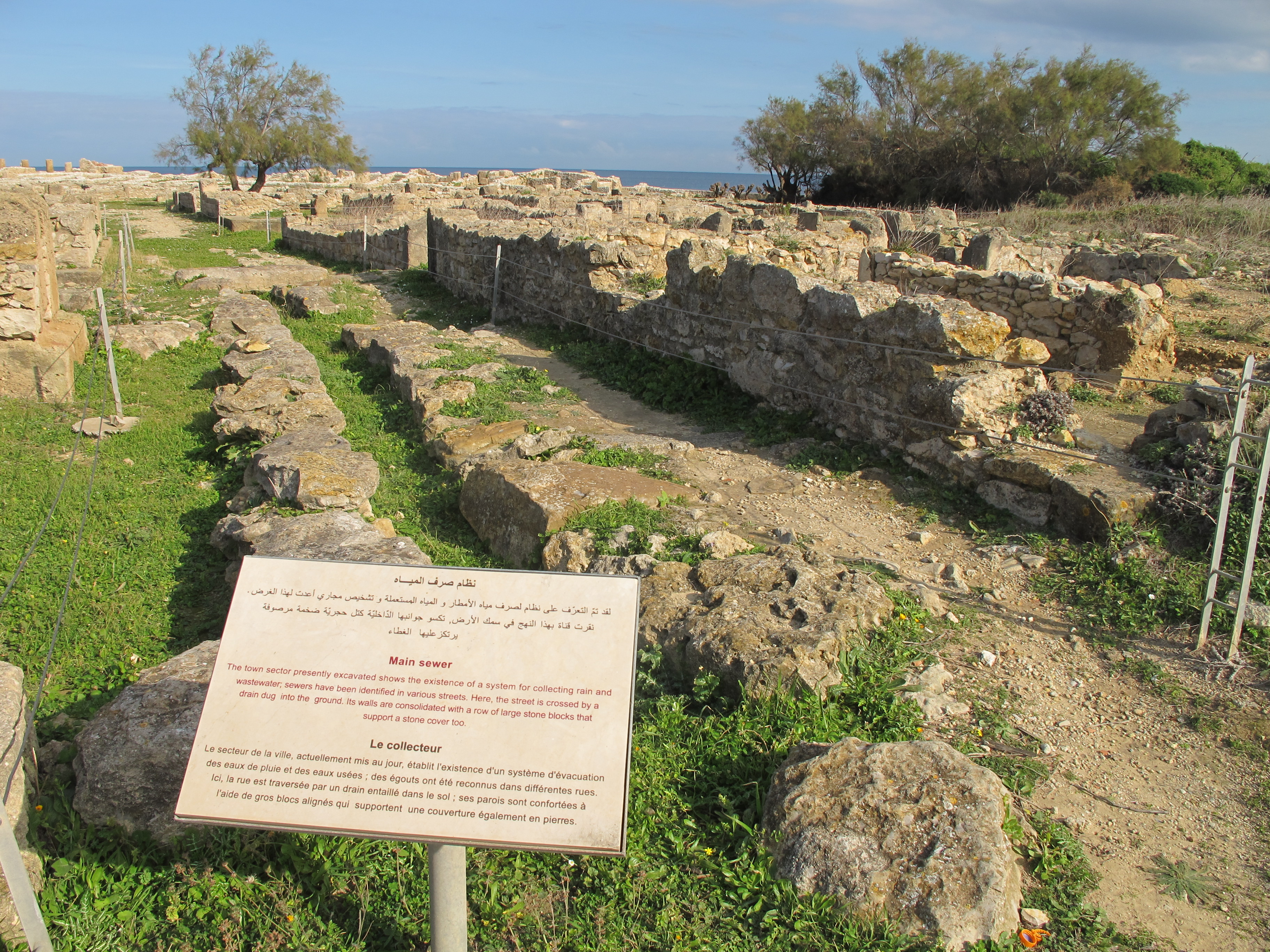
View of the archeological site

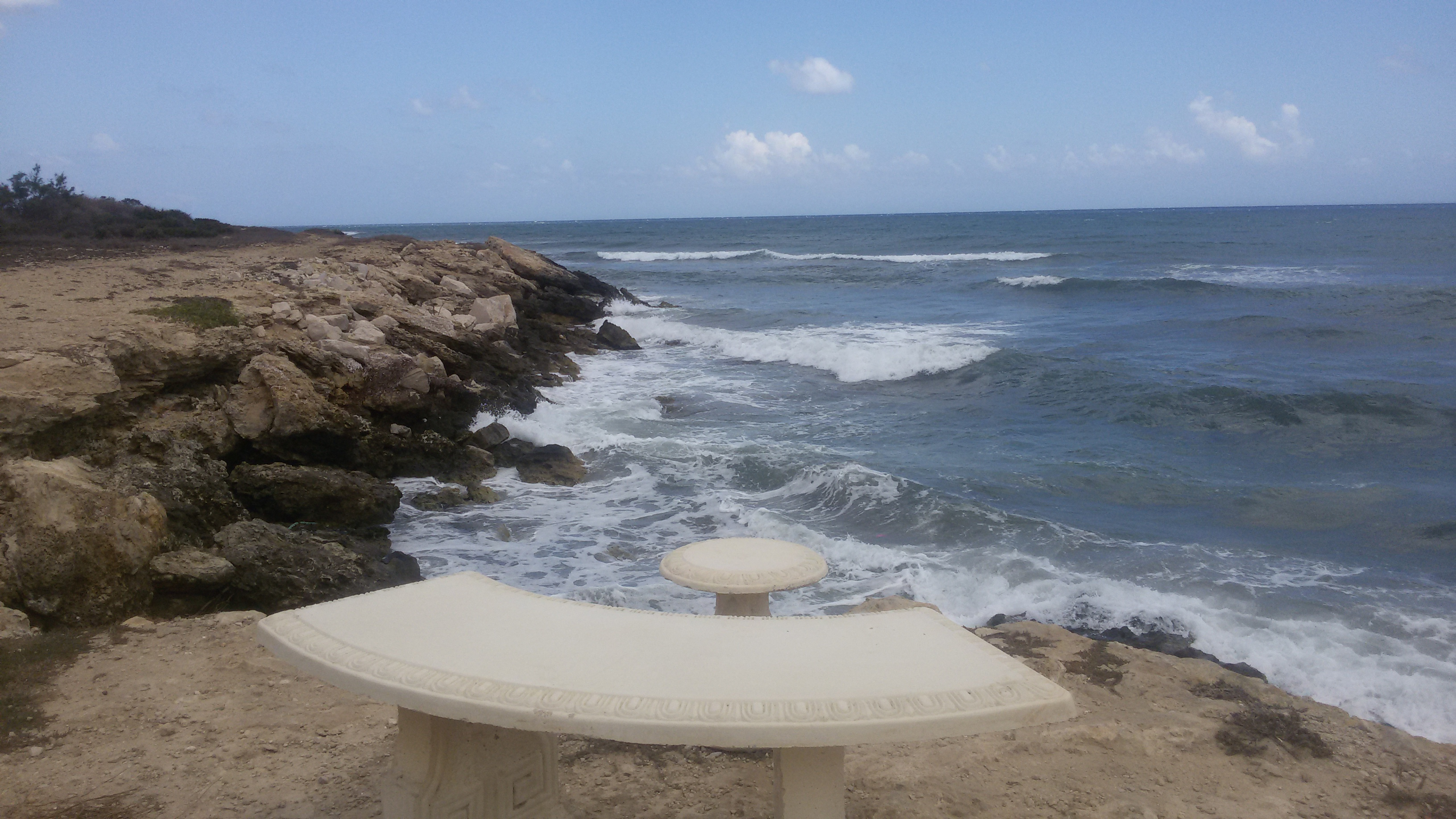
Outside Kerkouane museum

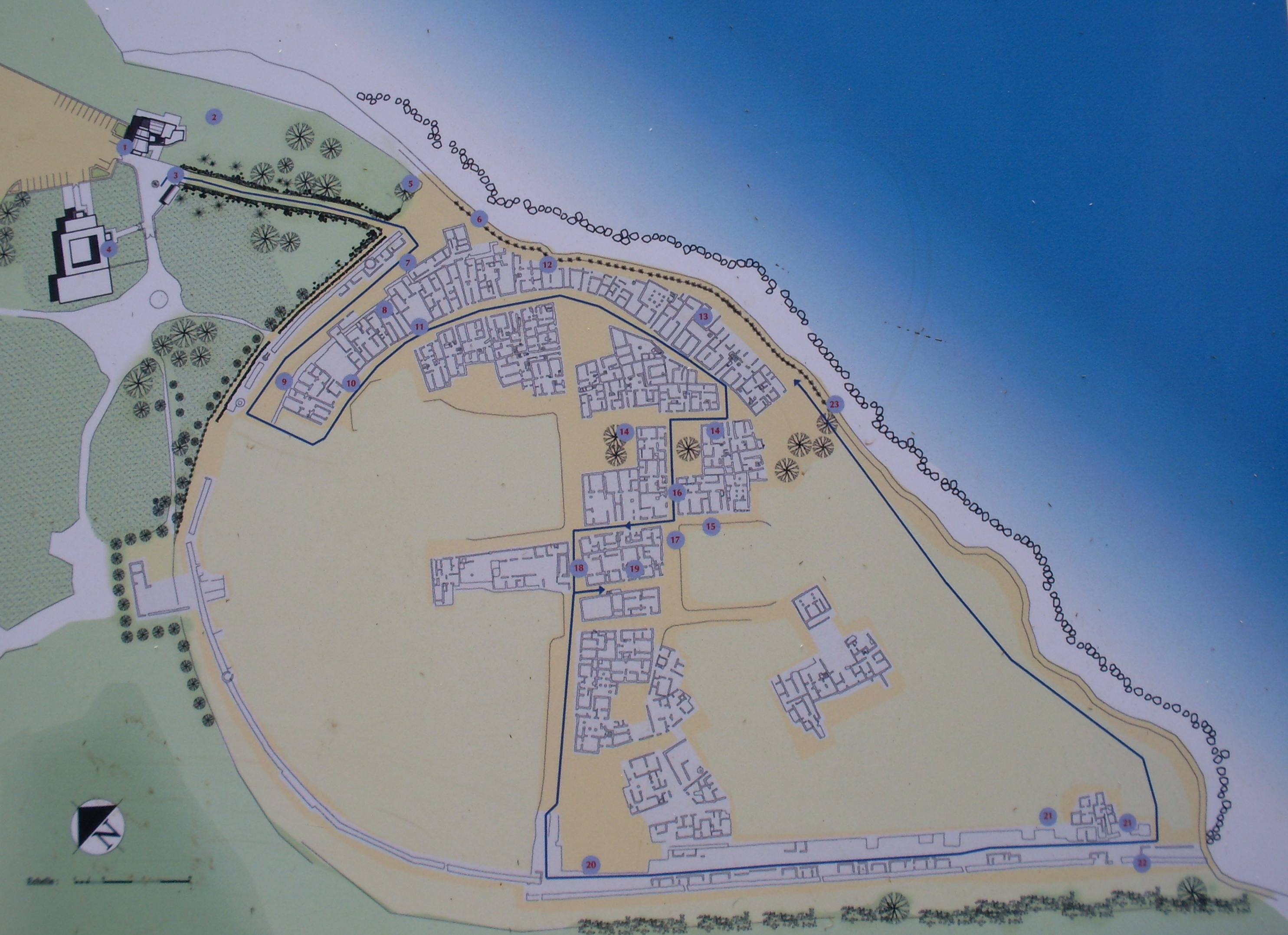
Plan of the site

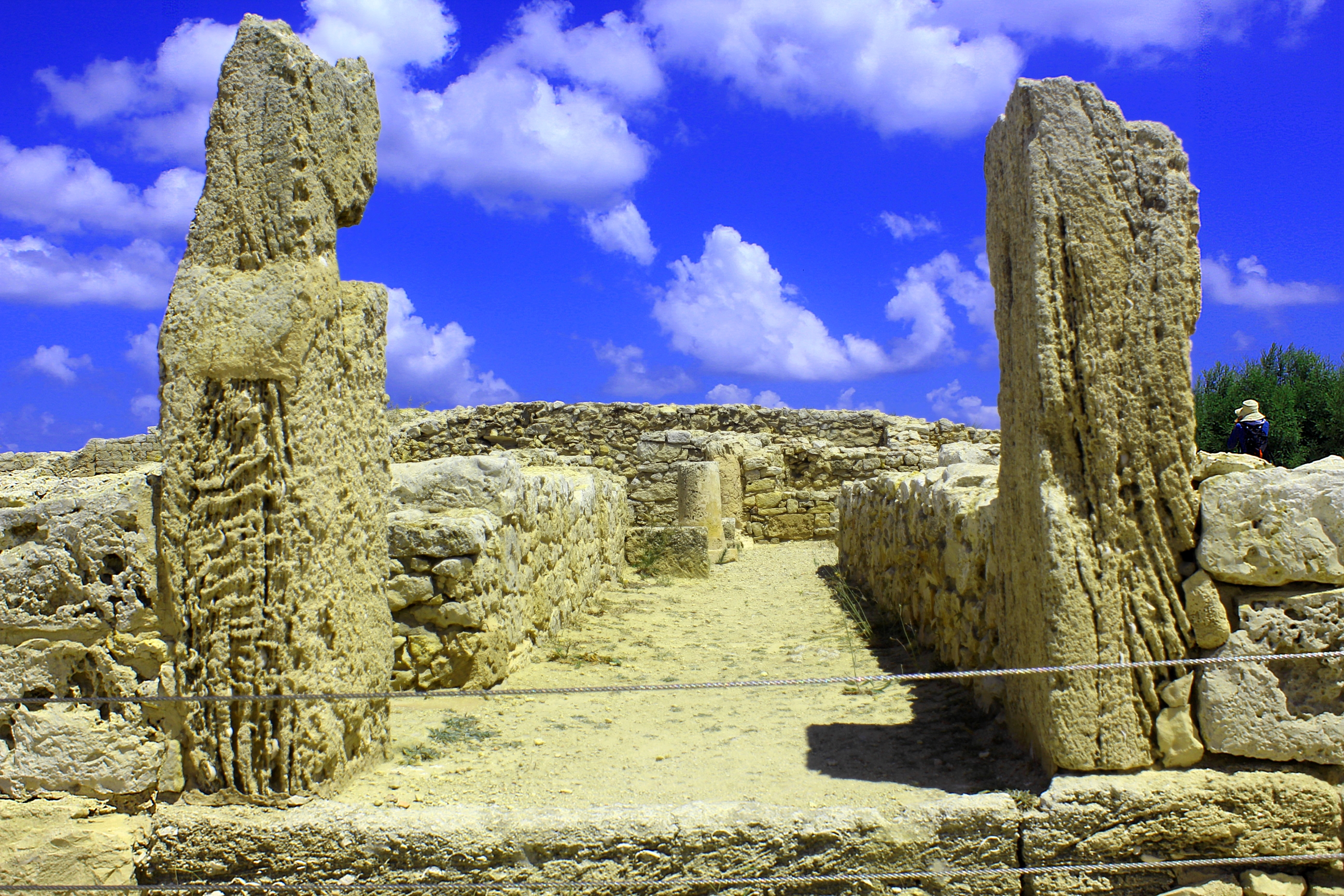
Remains of Tamezrat

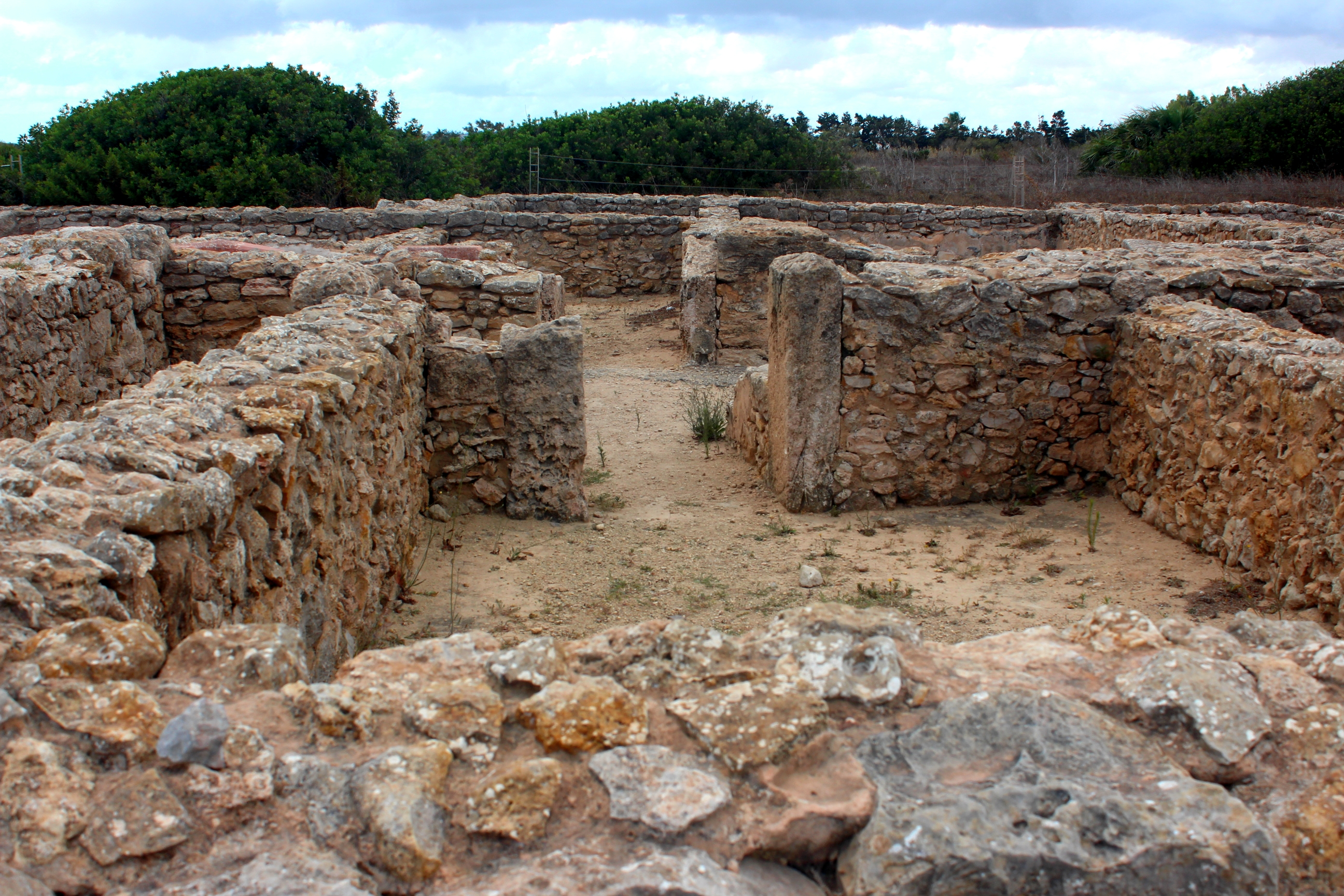
Remains of walls

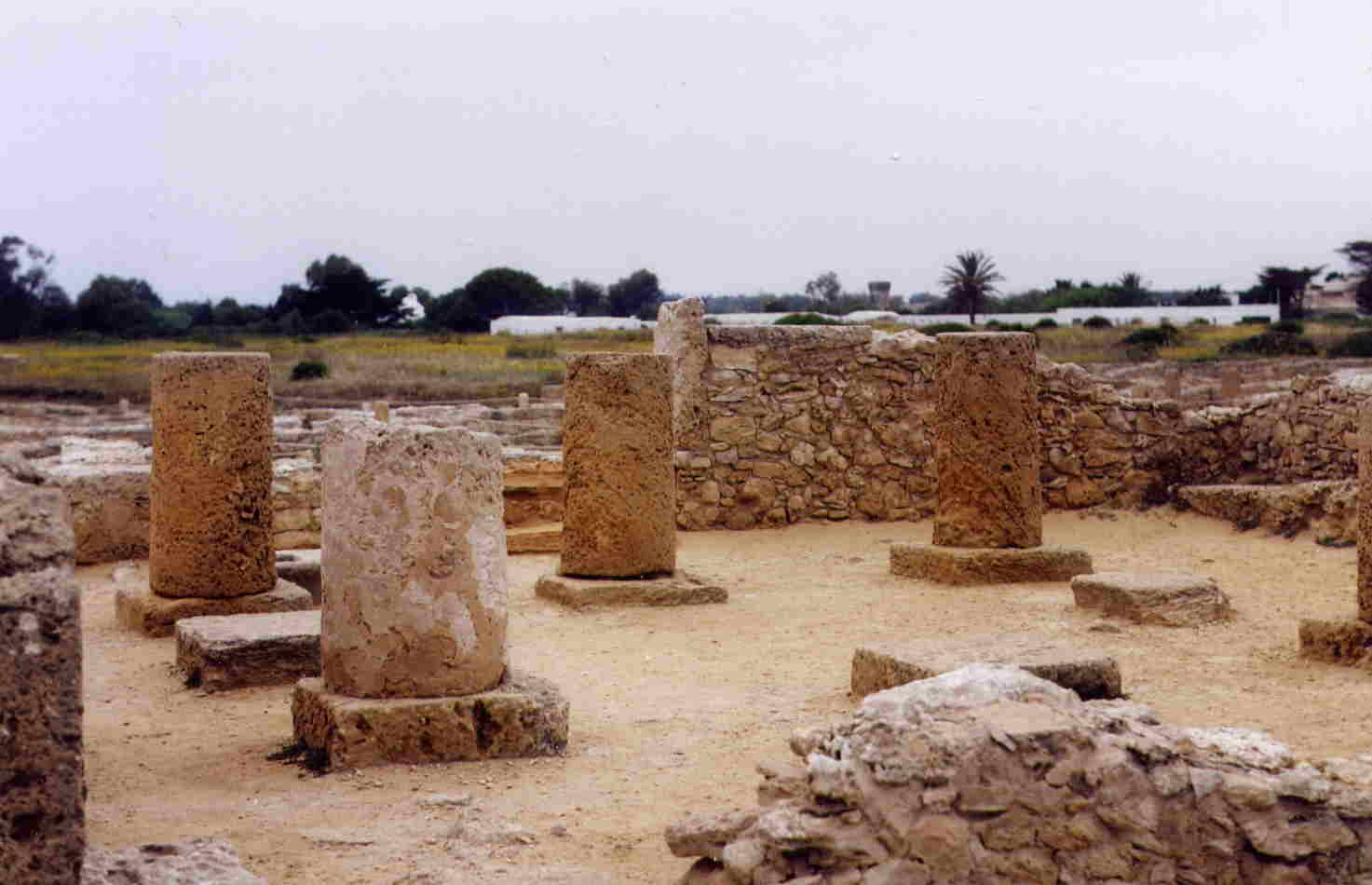
Remains of columns

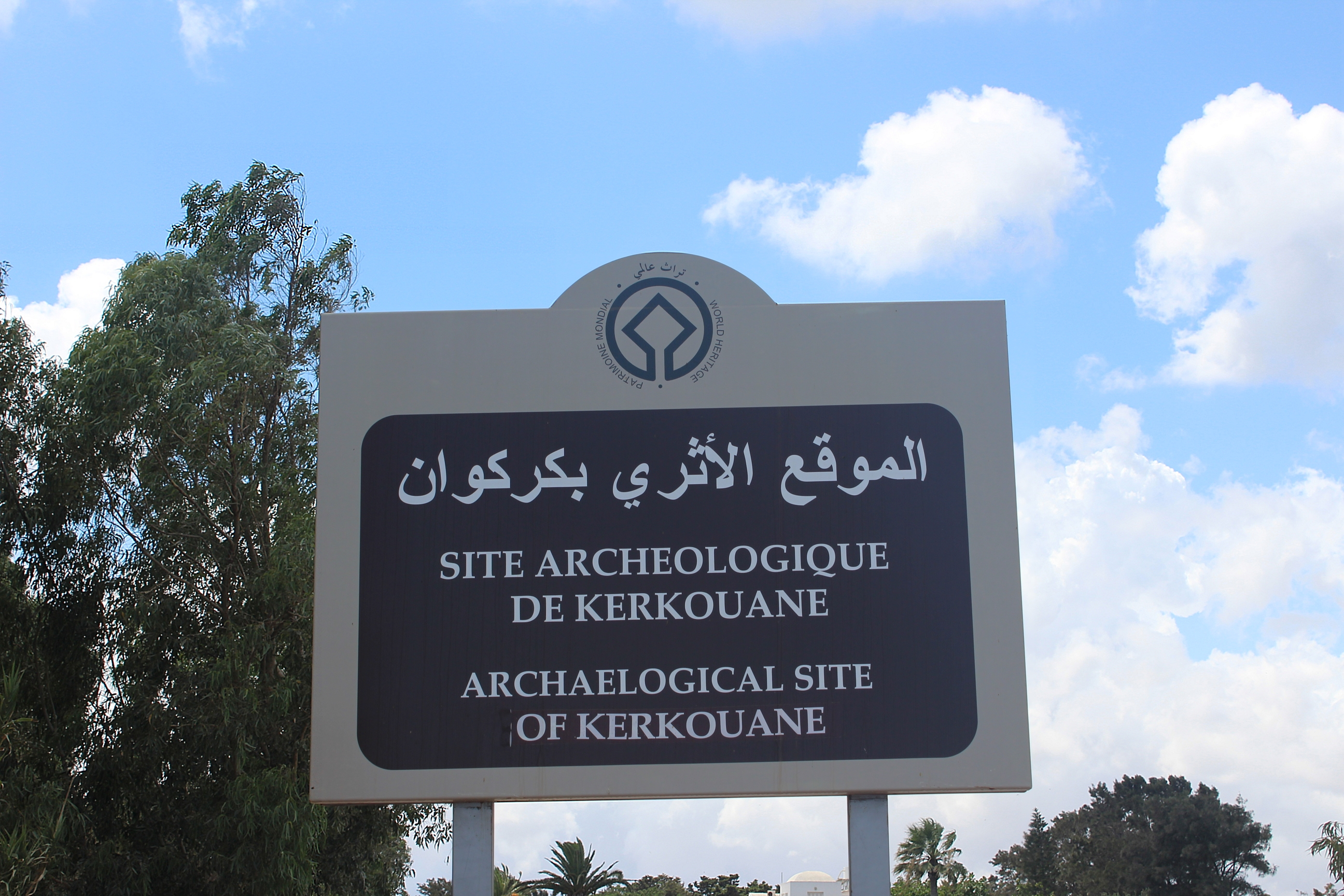
Sign of the site

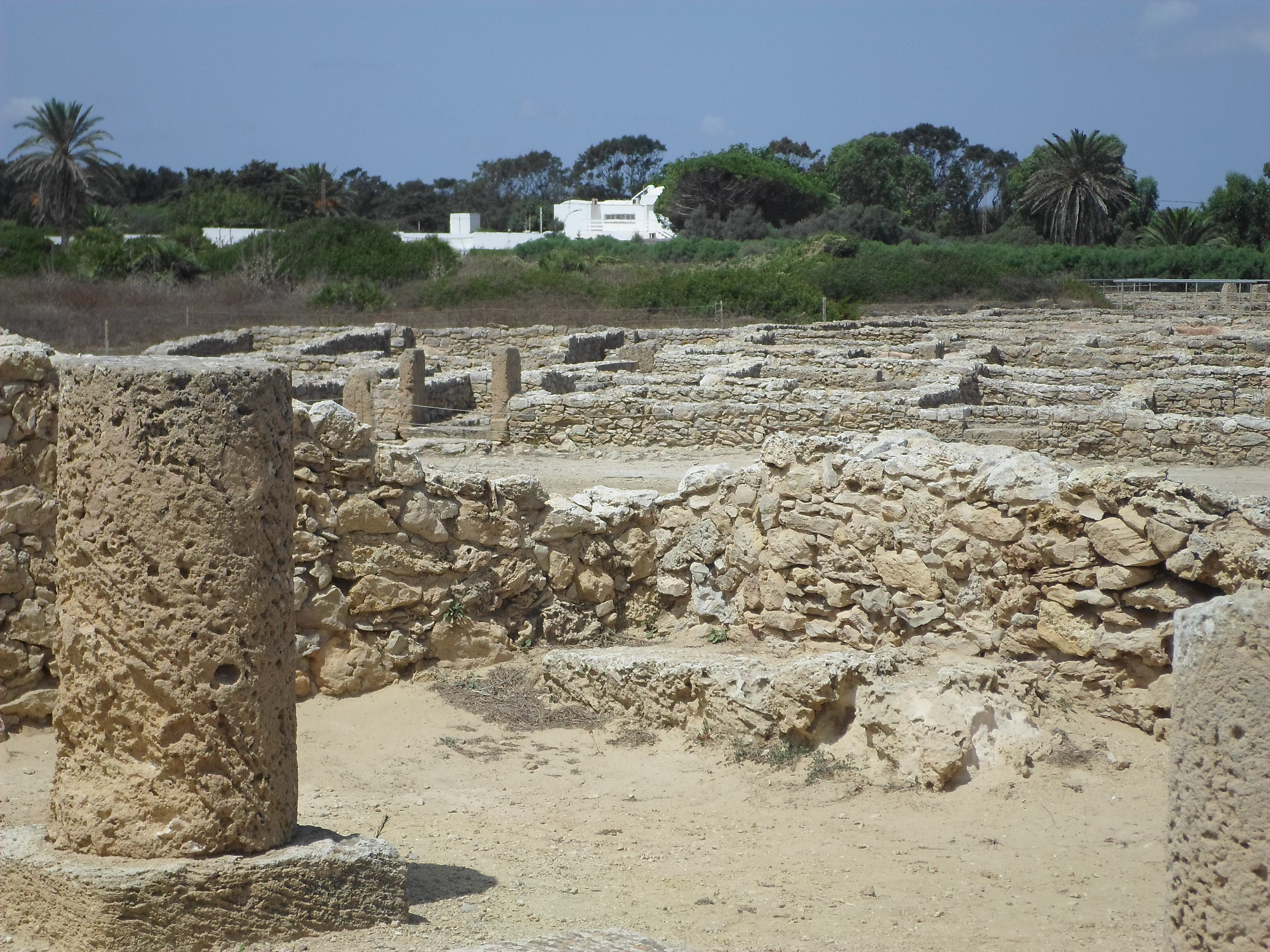
General view of the site
