= Arganthonios =

Ancient king of Tartessos

King of Tartessos
- Reign: 625 BC – 545 BC
- Predecessor: Habis
- Born: c. 665 BC; Tartessos, Hispania
- Died: c. 545 BC (aged 120?); Tartessos, Hispania

Arganthonios (Ancient Greek: Ἀργανθώνιος) was a king of ancient Tartessos (in Andalusia, southern Spain) who according to Herodotus, was visited by Kolaios of Samos. Given the legendary status of Geryon, Gargoris and Habis, Arganthonios is the earliest documented monarch of the Iberian Peninsula.

== Life ==
According to the Greek historian Herodotus, King Arganthonios ruled Tartessos for 80 years (from about 625 BC to 545 BC) and lived to be 120 years old, although some believe he lived to 150. This idea of great age and length of reign may result from a succession of kings using the same name or title. Herodotus says that Arganthonios warmly welcomed the first Greeks to reach Iberia, a ship carrying Phocaeans, and urged them fruitlessly to settle in Iberia. Hearing that the Medes were becoming a dominant force in the neighbourhood of the Phocaeans, he gave the latter money to build a defensive wall about their town. Herodotus comments that "he must have given with a bountiful hand, for the town is many furlongs in circuit".

== Name ==
Given the paucity of sources on the Tartessian language, the origin of the name "Arganthonios" is uncertain. Historians have noted the similarities with Celtic names. In fact, the word "Arganthonios" appears to be based on the Indo-European word for 'silver' (secondarily 'money'), reconstructed as Proto-Celtic *arganto- and proto-Italic as *argentom. (Note: Attested reflexes in Celtic include: Celtiberian arka^{n}ta (also compare arka^{n}to-beđom 'silver mine (?)'), Gaulish arganto- (in compounds), Old Irish argat, Old Welsh argant; in Latin as argentum, Faliscan arcentom with cognates Sanskrit rajatám, and others, from Proto-Indo-European *h₂r̥ǵn̥tóm 'silver', which is derived from a nominal root *h₂erǵ- 'white, brilliant; swift'; also compare Ancient Greek ἄργυρον (arguron) 'silver'.) Tartessos was rich in silver, like all of Iberia. Similar names (e.g. Argantoni) appear in inscriptions of the Roman period in or near former Tartessian territory. A name or title Argantoda(nos) is found on silver coinage in Northern Gaul and may have had a meaning akin to "treasurer". Some have identified Arganthonios with the "Tharsis Mask" at the Archeological Museum of Seville.

== See also ==
- Carpia
- Tartessian language
- Kolaios of Samos
