= Colaeus =

Samian explorer

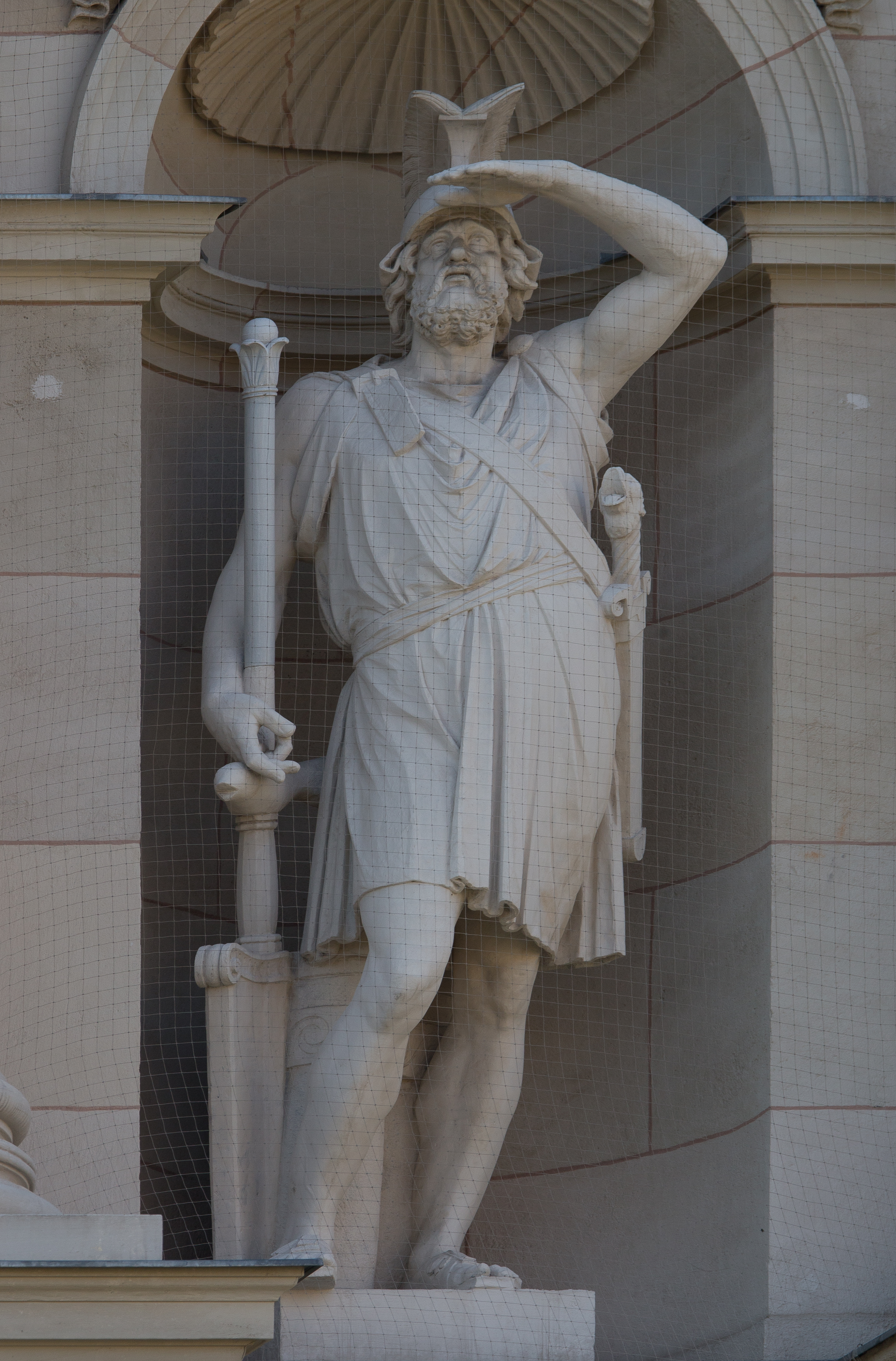

Colaeus (Greek: Κωλαῖος) was an ancient Samian explorer and silver merchant, who according to Herodotus (Hdt. 4.152) arrived at Tartessos c. 640 BC.

In an era where most Greek traders were anonymous, Herodotus believed that Colaeus and Sostratus the Aeginetan were important enough to note. Colaeus was on a venture to Egypt when he was blown off course by a great storm through the Mediterranean and into the Atlantic by the Strait of Gibraltar as far as Tartessus, south-western Spain. Tartessus had previously been unvisited by traders and Colaeus was able to obtain a cargo of metal and return it safely to Samos. Upon his return, he dedicated one tenth of his profits to his native goddess, Hera. It is widely believed that the storm was an invention by Colaeus to hide his trade route from his competitors as the rewards from the previously untapped source of metal proved immense. The Phocaeans were the first visitors of Tartessos (Herodotus (Hdt. 1.163)): Πρώτῃ δὲ Φωκαίη Ἰωνίης ἐπεχείρησε. Φωκαιέες .... καὶ τόν τε Ἀνδρίην καὶ τὴν Τυρσηνίην καὶ τὴν Ἰβηρίην καὶ τον Ταρτησσὸν οὗτοι εἰσὶν οἱ καταδέξαντες (First Ionian Phocea was involved. The Phoceans... discovered Adriatic and Tyrrenean and Iberia and Tartessos. Arriving at Tartessos they were welcomed by the Tartessian king by the name Arganthonios (ἀπικόμενοι δὲ ἐς τὸν Ταρτησσὸν προσφιλέες ἐγένοντο τῷ βασιλεῖ τῶν Ταρτησσίων, τῷ οὔνομα μὲν ἦν Ἀργαθώνιος). Colaeus' voyage was profitable enough for him to devote the tenth of his earnings to Hera. The Phoceans built a new fortification wall for Phocaea.

== Sources ==
- The role of metals in ancient Greek history By Michail Yu Treister Page 102 ISBN 90-04-09917-4
- The ancient explorers By Max Cary, Eric Herbert Warmington
