= Norax =

Legendary king of Tartessos

King of Tartessos
- Reign: ?
- Predecessor: Geryon
- Successor: Gargoris
- Born: Tartessos, Hispania
- Died: Tartessos, Hispania

Norax (Ancient Greek: Νῶραξ) was a mythological hero mentioned in the writings of ancient Greek and Roman writers. He was said to be the son of the god Hermes and Erytheia, the daughter of Geryon. Norax appears in the writings of Pausanias and Solinus.

== Mythology ==
According to Pausanias, Norax led a group of Iberians to Sardinia, where they founded the city of Nora, which was considered the first city on the island. Solinus adds that Norax came from the city of Tartessos in southern Iberia. His expedition was one of several mythological colonization traditions associated with Sardinia, alongside figures such as Sardus, Aristaeus, and Iolaus.

== See also ==
- Sardus
- Iolaus
