= Tophet =

Child sacrifice sites and cemeteries

In the Hebrew Bible, Tophet or Topheth (Biblical Hebrew: תֹּפֶת, romanized: Tōp̄eṯ; Ancient Greek: Ταφέθ, romanized: taphéth; Latin: Topheth) is a location in Jerusalem in the Valley of Hinnom (Gehenna), where worshipers engaged in a ritual involving "passing a child through the fire", most likely child sacrifice. Traditionally, the sacrifices have been ascribed to a god named Moloch. The Bible condemns and forbids these sacrifices, and the tophet is eventually destroyed by king Josiah, although mentions by the prophets Jeremiah, Ezekiel, and Isaiah suggest that the practices associated with the tophet may have persisted.

Most scholars agree that the ritual performed at the tophet was child sacrifice, and they connect it to similar episodes throughout the Bible and recorded in Phoenicia and Carthage by Hellenistic sources. There is disagreement about whether the sacrifices were offered to a god named "Moloch". Based on Phoenician and Carthaginian inscriptions, a growing number of scholars believe that the word moloch refers to the type of sacrifice rather than a deity. There is currently a dispute as to whether these sacrifices were dedicated to Yahweh rather than a foreign deity.

Archaeologists have applied the term "tophet" to large cemeteries of children found at Carthaginian sites that have traditionally been believed to house sacrificed human children, as described by Hellenistic and biblical sources. This interpretation is controversial: some scholars argue that the tophets may have been children's cemeteries and reject Hellenistic sources as anti-Carthaginian propaganda. Others argue that not all burials in the tophet were sacrifices.

The tophet and its location later became associated with divine punishment in Jewish eschatology.

== Etymology ==
There is no consensus on the etymology of tophet, a word which only occurs eight times in the Masoretic Text. The word may be derived from the Aramaic word taphyā meaning "hearth", "fireplace", or "roaster", a proposal first made by William Robertson Smith in 1887. Some have suggested that the word has been altered via using the vocalization of bōsheth "shame". Others derive the word from the Hebrew root špt "to set (on fire)", cognate with Ugaritic ṯpd "to set". A new proposal has been made to interpret the term as "place of vow" by Robert M. Kerr.

The Talmud (Eruvin 19a) and Jerome derive the name from a Hebrew verb meaning "to seduce". The historically most significant etymology, followed by both Jewish and Christian exegetes until the modern period, was made by the 11th-century CE rabbi Rashi, who derived the term from Hebrew toph "drum", claiming that the drums were beaten during the sacrifice to Moloch, deriving his ideas from Plutarch's description of Carthaginian sacrifice. This derivation is, however, morphologically impossible.

== Biblical and Levantine references ==
=== In the Bible ===
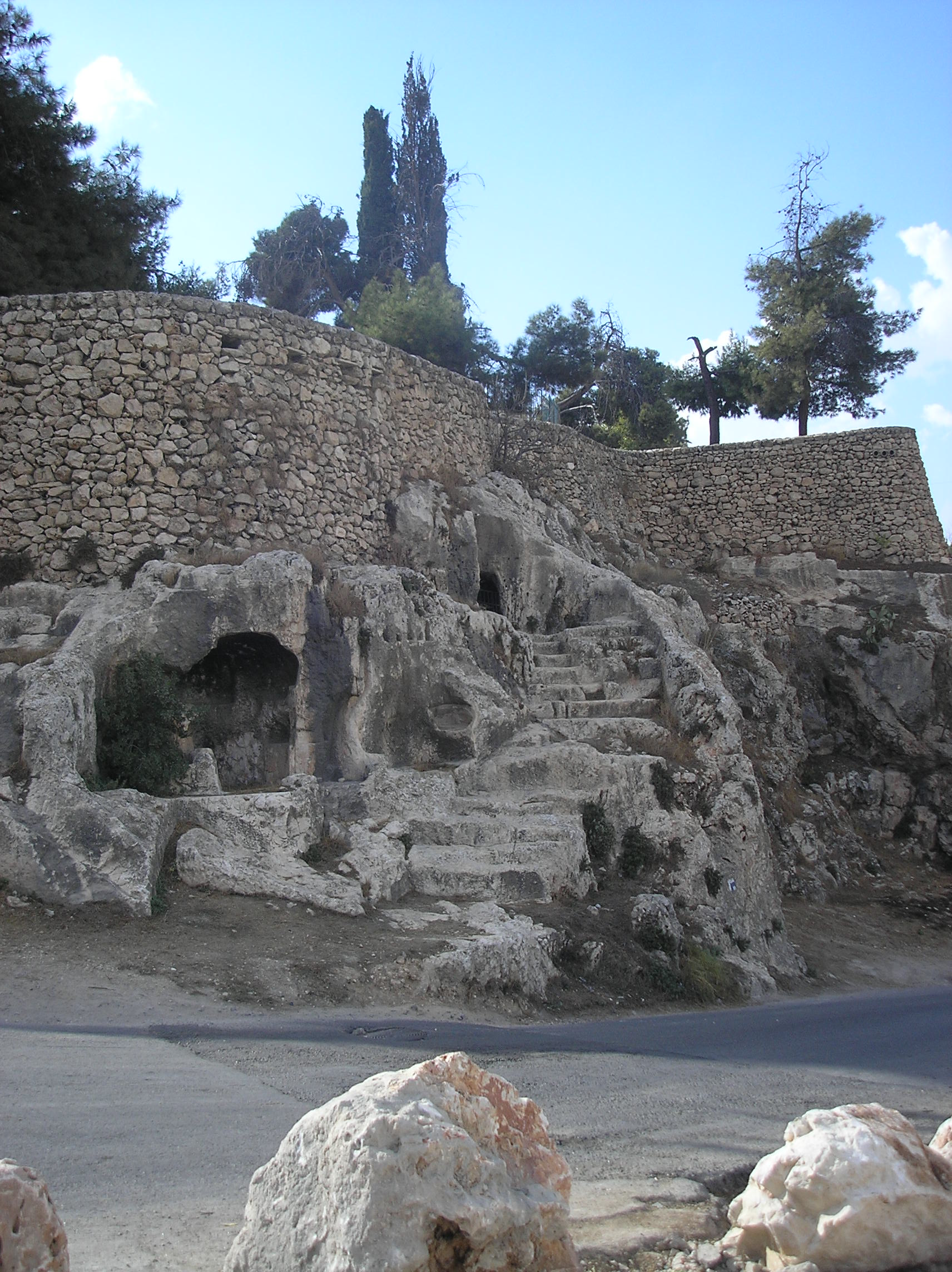
Tombs in the Valley of Hinnom, the location of the tophet according to the Bible.

The tophet is attested 8 times in the Hebrew Bible, mostly to designate a place of ritual fire or burning, but sometimes as a place name. The connection to ritual fire is made explicit in 2 Kings 23:10, Isaiah 30:33; and Jeremiah 7:31–32. In 2 Kings, King Josiah

defiled Topheth, which is in the valley of the son of Hinnom, that no man might make his son or his daughter to pass through the fire to Molech.

The text includes the destruction of the Tophet among Josiah's other removal of "deviant" religious practices from Israel as part of a far reaching religious reform. However, the continued condemnation of both the tophet and related practices by prophets such as Jeremiah and Ezekiel suggests that the practice may have continued after Josiah's reform, with a mention of the tophet by Isaiah suggesting it may have even continued after the Babylonian exile. Prior to Josiah's reform, the ritual of passing a child through the fire is mentioned, without specifying that it took place at the tophet, as having been performed by the Israelite kings Ahaz and Manasseh:

But [Ahaz] walked in the way of the kings of Israel, yea, and made his son to pass through the fire, according to the abominations of the heathen, whom the LORD cast out from before the children of Israel. (2 Kings 16:3)

And [Manasseh] made his son to pass through the fire, and practised soothsaying, and used enchantments, and appointed them that divined by a ghost or a familiar spirit: he wrought much evil in the sight of the LORD, to provoke Him. (2 Kings 21:6)

Both kings perform the sacrifices when faced with the prospect of wars. The sacrifices appear to have been to Yahweh, the god of Israel, and to have been performed in the tophet.

The tophet is condemned repeatedly by name in the Book of Jeremiah, and the term is especially associated with that book of the bible. An example is at Jeremiah 7:31–33:

And they have built the high places of Topheth, which is in the valley of the son of Hinnom, to burn their sons and their daughters in the fire; which I commanded not, neither came it into My mind. Therefore, behold, the days come, saith the LORD, that it shall no more be called Topheth, nor the valley of the son of Hinnom, but the valley of slaughter; for they shall bury in Topheth, for lack of room.

Jeremiah associates the tophet with Baal; however, other sources all associate it with Moloch.

P. Xella argues that no fewer than twenty-five passages in the Hebrew Bible show the Israelites and Canaanites sacrificing their children, including passages in Deuteronomy, (Dt. 12:13, 18:10), Leviticus (Lev. 18:21, 20:2-5), 2 Kings, 2 Chronicles, Isaiah, Ezra, Psalm 106, and the Book of Job. In 2 Kings 3:26–27, king Mesha of Moab burns his first-born son as an offering while besieged by the Israelites:

And when the king of Moab saw that the battle was too sore for him, he took with him seven hundred men that drew sword, to break through unto the king of Edom; but they could not. Then he took his eldest son that should have reigned in his stead, and offered him for a burnt-offering upon the wall. And there came great wrath upon Israel; and they departed from him, and returned to their own land.

This act has been compared with Greco-Roman sources discussing the Phoenicians and Carthaginians engaging in the same or a similar practice in times of danger (see below). It appears to have been performed for the Moabite god Kemosh.

=== Extrabiblical attestations ===
There is no archaeological evidence for the Tophet at Jerusalem, so that we are reliant on the biblical descriptions to understand it. Archaeology has not yet securely identified any Tophets in the Levant, but there is other evidence for child sacrifice there. Ancient Egyptian inscriptions from the second millennium BCE attest the practice in the Levant. A late 8th-century BCE Phoenician inscription from İncirli in Turkey may indicate that first born sons were sacrificed there along with sheep and horses. The sacrifice of first-born sons in times of crisis appears to be dealt with at length in the inscription, although the precise context is unclear.

Greco-Roman sources also reference child sacrifice, such as an attempt at Tyre to revive a custom of sacrificing a boy during Alexander the Great's Siege of Tyre in 332 BCE, recorded by first century CE Roman historian Quintus Curtius Rufus. The church historian Eusebius (3rd century CE) quotes from Philo of Byblos's Phoenician history that:

It was a custom of the ancients in great crises of danger for the rulers of a city or nation, in order to avert the common ruin, to give up the most beloved of their children for sacrifice as a ransom to the avenging daemons; and those who were thus given up were sacrificed with mystic rites. Kronos then, whom the Phoenicians call Elus, who was king of the country and subsequently, after his decease, was deified as the star Saturn, had by a nymph of the country named Anobret an only begotten son, whom they on this account called ledud, the only begotten being still so called among the Phoenicians; and when very great dangers from war had beset the country, he arrayed his son in royal apparel, and prepared an altar, and sacrificed him.

(Euseubius of Caesarea, Praeparatio Evangelica 1.10.44 = 4.16.11)

=== Theories ===
Although a minority of scholars has argued that the tophet ritual described in the Bible was a harmless activity that did not involve sacrificing any children, the majority of scholars agree that the Bible depicts human sacrifice as occurring at the tophet. Modern scholarship has described sacrifice at the tophet as a mulk or mlk (sacrifice). The term appears to derive from a verb meaning "presentation as an offering" from the root ylk "to offer, present" found in Phoenician and Carthaginian inscriptions in the phrases mlk ʾdm "sacrifice a human", mlk bʿl "to sacrifice a citizen", and mlk bšr "sacrifice in place of flesh". Lawrence Stager and Samuel Wolff argue that the term "refers to a live sacrifice of a child or animal".

Modern scholarship debates the identity of the god to whom these sacrifices were directed, with a dispute arising over whether the sacrifices were part of the cult of Yahweh. Tradition identifies the god to whom the sacrifices were offered as Moloch, supposedly an underworld god whose name means "king". The Bible connects the tophet with Moloch in two later texts, 2 Kings 23:10 and Jeremiah 32:35. Lindsay Cooper writes in support of this connection: "The location of the Jerusalem tofet outside the city's eastern wall, at the traditional entrance to the netherworld, explicitly connects child sacrifice with the cult of death." However, while some scholars continue to argue the existence of an underworld deity called "M-l-k", there is no evidence to connect such a deity to human sacrifice. Later Phoenician and Punic child-sacrifices called mlk in inscriptions or described by Greco-Roman sources are not associated with these gods. On the basis of the word mlk meaning "to sacrifice" "an increasing number of scholars now take the biblical traditions to attest not to the offering of children in fiery sacrifices to the deity "Molek", but rather to the sacrifice of children as "mlk" offerings to another deity". On the basis of the stories of Abraham and Jephthah offering their children to Yahweh, as well as Micah 6:6–7 and other passages, Francesca Stavrakopoulou argues that the offerings were in fact dedicated to Yahweh rather than to a foreign deity.

=== Association with punishment ===
The topheth's description as a place of punishment derives in part by the use of the word in Isaiah 30:33, in which Yahweh ignites a large tophet to punish the Assyrians:

For a hearth [tophet] is ordered of old; yea, for the king it is prepared, deep and large; the pile thereof is fire and much wood; the breath of the LORD, like a stream of brimstone, doth kindle it.

The location of the tophet, the valley of Gehenna, subsequently became a place of punishment in the eschatology of Jewish Apocalypticism, something found in the 3rd- or 4th-century BCE Book of Enoch (1 Enoch 26:4; 27:2–3). The Talmud, discussing the passage in Isaiah, states that whoever commits evil will fall there (Eruvin 19a).

== Carthage and the western Mediterranean ==
Various Greek and Roman sources describe the Carthaginians as engaging in the practice of sacrificing children by burning as part of their religion. These descriptions were compared to those found in the Hebrew Bible. The ancient descriptions were seemingly confirmed by the discovery in Carthage in 1921 of the so-called "Tophet of Salambô", which contained the urns of cremated children. However, modern historians and archaeologists debate the reality and extent of this practice. Some scholars propose that all remains at the Tophet resulted from sacrifices, whereas others propose that only some do. Whilst scholars generally see the Carthaginians as faithful adherents to the mainland Phoenician religion, others regard them as dissidents and their sacrificial customs as unique innovations.

=== Archaeological evidence ===
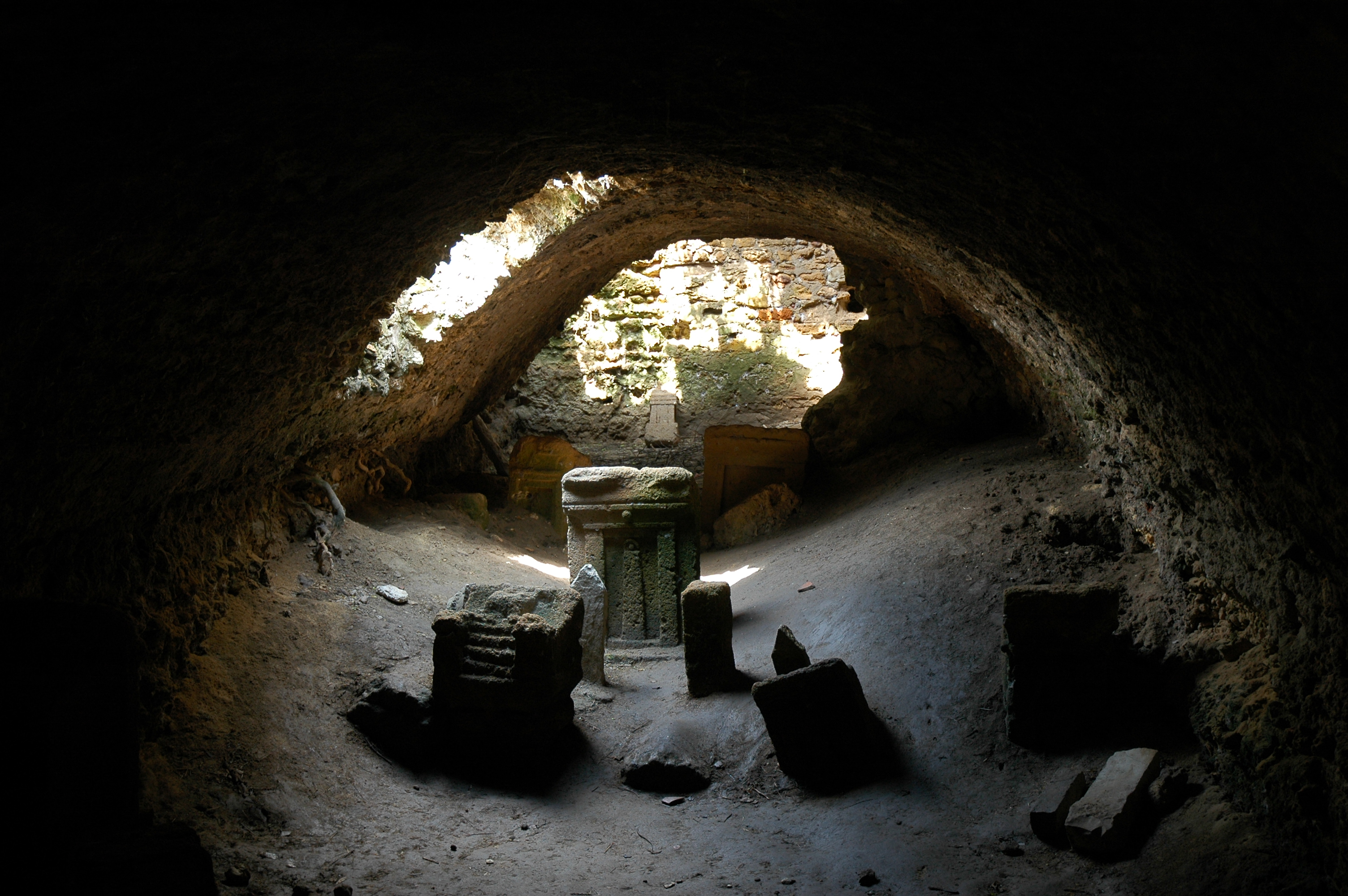
Stelae in the Carthage tophet covered by a vault built in the Roman period

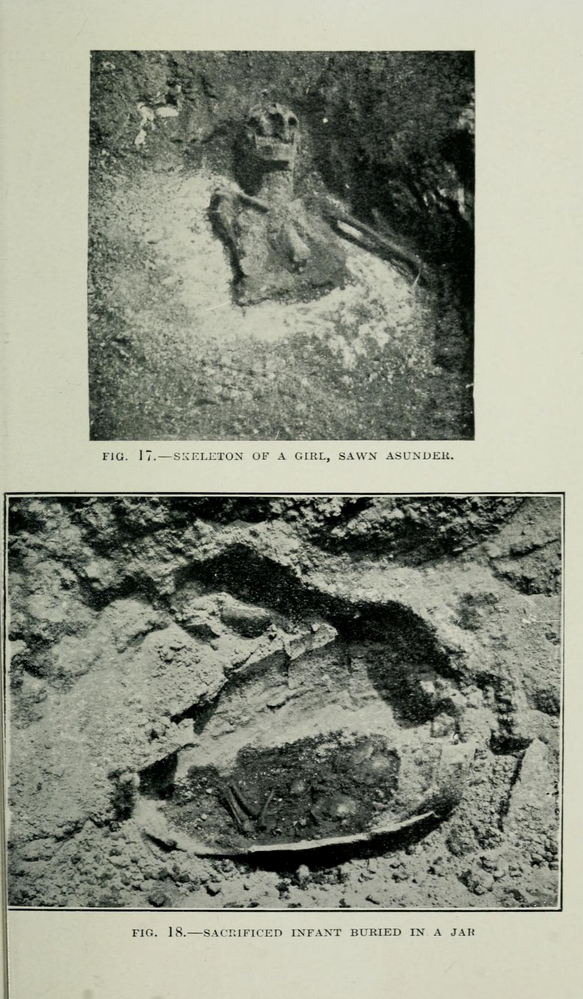
Macalister said the infant sacrifice remains found here, all less than a week old, were sometimes in jars and with smaller jars, perhaps food for what they thought was still to come.

In Phoenician sites throughout the Western Mediterranean (except in the Iberian Peninsula and Ibiza), archaeology has revealed fields full of buried urns containing the burnt remains of human infants and lambs, covered by carved stone monuments. Archaeologists conventionally refer to these fields as "tophets", after the location mentioned in the Bible. When Carthaginian inscriptions refer to these locations, they use the terms bt (house, temple or sanctuary) or qdš (shrine), not "tophet". Archaeology reveals two "generations" of Punic tophets: those founded by Phoenician colonists between 800 and 400 BCE; and those established under Carthaginian influence (direct or indirect) in North Africa from the 4th century BCE onward.

No Carthaginian literary texts survive that would explain or describe what rituals were performed in connection with such "tophets". Archaeological evidence shows that the remains could consist of human infants or of lambs, often mixed with small portions of other animals, including cows, pigs, fish, birds, and deer. The proportion of lamb to human remains differs by site. At Carthage, 31% of the urns contained lambs; Tharros has 47%. Analysis of the bone fragments provides some information about the remains. In a sample of seventy infants from the tophet at Carthage, 37% were identified as male and 54% as female. The age of the children and whether they had died before they were interred is controversial (see below). The lambs are usually between one and three months old; this might indicate that offerings were made at a specific time following the lambing (February/March and October/November). The bone fragments were subjected to uneven temperatures, indicating they were burnt on an open-air pyre over several hours. The remains were then collected and placed in an urn, sometimes mixing in bones from other infants or lambs—suggesting that multiple infants/lambs were burnt on the same pyre. Sometimes jewellery or amulets were added to the urn. The urn was placed in the ground, in holes cut into the bedrock or within boxes made from stone slabs. In some cases a stone monument was set up above the urn. This could take the form of a stele, cippus, or throne, often with figural decoration and an inscription. In a few occasions, a chapel was built as well. Steles are oriented toward the east.

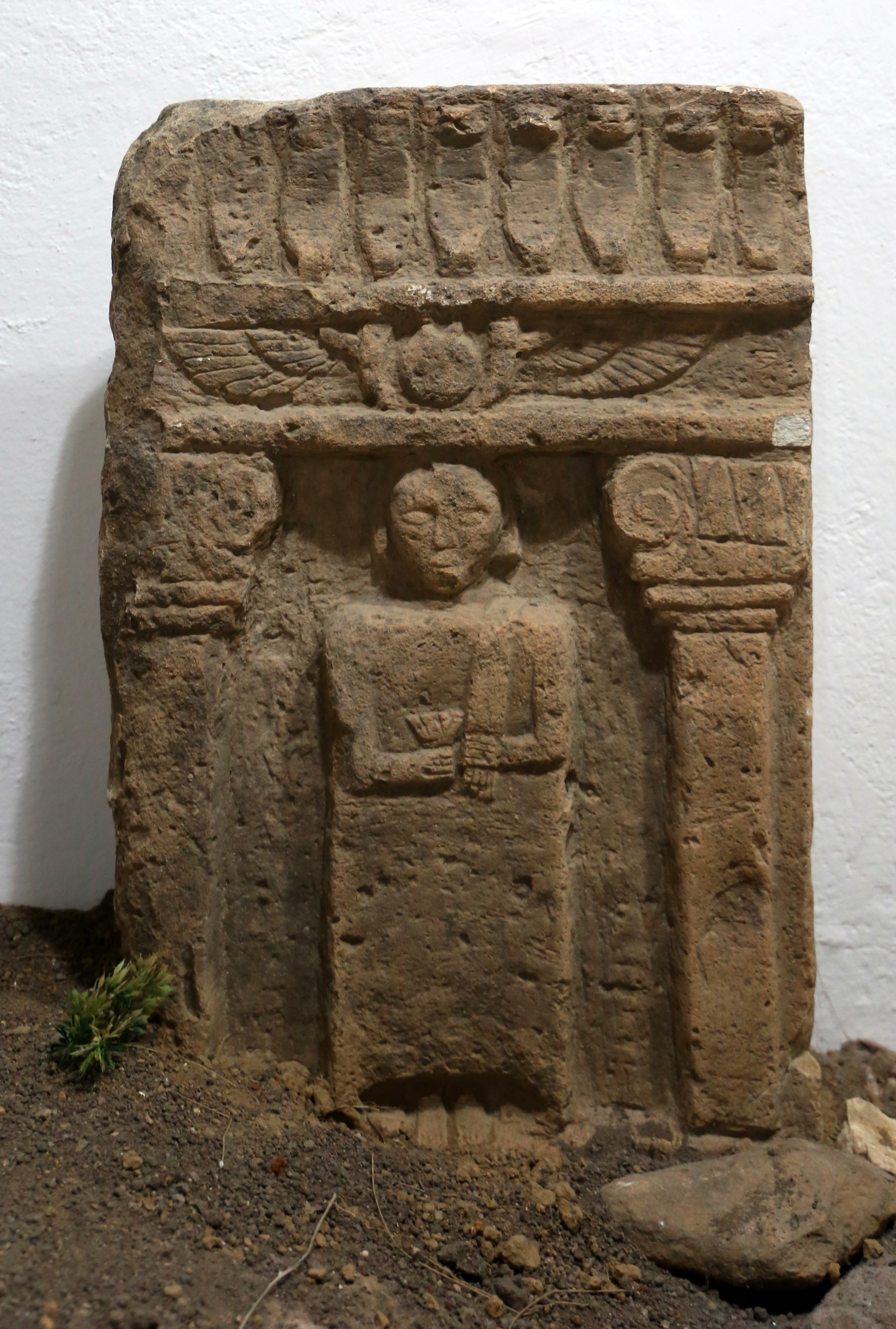
Stone marker from the tophet at Monte Sirai, Sardinia, with figural decoration

The figural decoration on the stone monuments takes different forms in different regions. In Carthage, geometric patterns were preferred. In Sardinia, human figures are more common. Inscriptions are most common in the Carthage tophet, where there are thousands of examples. There are some from other tophets as well. Matthew McCarty cites CIS I.2.511 as a typical inscription:

To Lady Tanit, face of Baal, and to Lord Baal Hammon: [that] which Arisham son of Bodashtart, son of Bodeshmun vowed (ndr); because he (the god) heard his (Arisham's) voice, he blessed him.

Thus, these texts present the monument as a votive offering to the gods in thanks for a favour received from them. Sometimes the final clause instead reads "may he (the god) hear his voice" (i.e. in expectation of a future favour). The individual making the offering is almost always a single individual, nearly always male. The dead child is never mentioned. Tanit appears only in examples from Carthage. Other inscriptions refer to the ritual as mlk or molk. The meaning of this term is uncertain, but it appears to be an analogue of the Biblical term "Molech" discussed above. The inscriptions distinguish between mlk b'l / mlk ʿdm (molk of a citizen/person) and mlk ʿmr (molk of a lamb).

Over a hundred tophets have been identified. The earliest examples were established at Carthage, Malta, Motya in western Sicily, and Tharros in southern Sardinia, when the Phoenicians first settled in these areas in the ninth century BCE. The largest known tophet, the Carthage tophet, seems to have been established at this time and to have continued in use for at least a few decades after the city's destruction in 146 BCE. The stone markers first appeared at Salammbô, Carthage around 650 BCE and spread to Motya and Tharros around 600 BCE. Between the fifth and third centuries BCE, tophets became more common in southern Sardinia and the Carthaginian hinterland as Phoenician settlement expanded. In Sicily and Sardinia, tophets slowly went out of use in the third and second centuries BCE, following the establishment of Roman control in the First Punic War of 264 to 241 BCE. In the same period in North Africa, many new tophets were established, mainly inland in Tunisia. Many of these tophets remained in use after the fall of Carthage in 146 BCE. In the late-first and second centuries CE, migration resulting from military deployment-patterns led to establishing new tophets in Tunisia and eastern Algeria. In the Roman period, inscriptions named the god to which the monuments were dedicated as Saturn. In addition to infants, some of these tophets contain offerings only of goats, sheep, birds, or plants; many of the worshipers have Libyan rather than Punic names. Their use appears to have declined in the second and third centuries CE.

=== Greco-Roman sources ===
Greco-Roman sources frequently criticize the Carthaginians for engaging in child sacrifice. The earliest references to the practice are bare references in Sophocles and in the Pseudo-Platonic dialogue, Minos, probably of the fourth century BCE. The late-fourth century BCE philosopher Theophrastus claimed that the Syracusan tyrant Gelon had demanded that the Carthaginians abandon the practice after he defeated them in the Battle of Himera (480 BC).

The first detailed account comes from Cleitarchus, an early-third-century BCE historian of Alexander the Great, who is quoted by a scholiast as saying:

Phoenicians, and above all Carthaginians, worship Kronos; if they wish to achieve something big, they devote a child of theirs, and in the case of success, sacrifice it to the god. There is a bronze statue of Kronos among them, which stands upright with open arms and palms of its hands facing upwards above a bronze brazier on which the child is burnt. When the flames reach the body, the victim's limbs stiffen and the tense mouth almost seems like it is laughing until, with a final spasm, the child falls in the brazier.
Cleitarchus FGrH no. 137, F 9

The first-century BCE Greek historian Diodorus Siculus writes that, when the Carthaginians were besieged by Agathocles of Syracuse in 310 BCE, the Carthaginians responded by sacrificing large numbers of children according to an old custom they had abandoned:

They also alleged that Kronos had turned against them inasmuch as in former times they had been accustomed to sacrifice to this god the noblest of their sons, but more recently, secretly buying and nurturing children, they had sent these to the sacrifice; and when an investigation was made, some of those who had been sacrificed were discovered to have been substituted by stealth. ... In their zeal to make amends for the omission, they selected two hundred of the noblest children and sacrificed them publicly; and others who were under suspicion sacrificed themselves voluntarily, in number not less than three hundred. There was in the city a bronze image of Kronos, extending its hands, palms up and sloping towards the ground, so that each of the children when placed thereon rolled down and fell into a sort of gaping pit filled with fire.

Elsewhere in the Bibliotheca Diodorus claims that wealthy Carthaginians would purchase infant slaves to offer in lieu of their own children.

The writer Plutarch (c. 46–120 CE) also mentions the practice:

... with full knowledge and understanding they themselves offered up their own children, and those who had no children would buy little ones from poor people and cut their throats as if they were so many lambs or young birds; meanwhile the mother stood by without a tear or moan; but should she utter a single moan or let fall a single tear, she had to forfeit the money, and her child was sacrificed nevertheless; and the whole area before the statue was filled with a loud noise of flutes and drums so that the cries of wailing should not reach the ears of the people."

Several Christian authors allude to the practice in the early centuries CE. The Christian apologist Tertullian, about 200 CE, states that although the priests who sacrificed children had been crucified by a Roman procurator, "that holy crime persists in secret". Another Christian writer, Minucius Felix, claims that Punic women aborted their children as a form of sacrifice.

=== Controversy ===
The degree and existence of Carthaginian child-sacrifice is controversial. Some archaeologists and historians argue that the literary and archaeological evidence indicates that all remains in the tophets were the victims of sacrifices. Sabatino Moscati and other scholars have argued that the tophets were cemeteries for premature or short-lived infants who died naturally and then were ritually offered.

The accounts given by the Greco-Roman authors are questionable. Those writers were not eye-witnesses, contradict each other on how the children were killed, and describe children older than infants being killed as opposed to the infants found in the tophets. The archaeological evidence is not consistent with the mechanical statue of Cronus mentioned by Cleitarchus and Diodorus. There are no references to child sacrifice in Greco-Roman accounts of the Punic Wars of 264 to 146 BCE, which are better documented than the earlier periods for which mass child-sacrifice is claimed. Many, but not all, Greco-Roman authors were hostile to the Carthaginians because they had been enemies in the Sicilian and Punic Wars; this may have influenced their presentation of the practice. Matthew McCarty argues that, even if the Greco-Roman testimonies are inaccurate "even the most fantastical slanders rely upon a germ of fact".

The archaeological evidence is ambiguous. An osteological study of the remains at Carthage by Jeffrey Schwartz et al. suggested that 38% of a sample of 540 individuals had died before or during childbirth, based on the size of the bones, the development of teeth, and the absence of neonatal lines on teeth. Another osteological study of the same material challenged these findings, arguing that it had not taken account of the shrinkage of the bones caused by the burning process. The form of the deposits in tophets is different from Carthaginian graves for non-infants, which usually took the form of burials, not cremations. Phoenician grave-goods are also different from the objects found with the human remains in tophets. However, cross-culturally, funerary practices for infants often differ from those for non-infants.

Many archaeologists argue that the ancient authors and the evidence of the Tophet indicate that all remains in the Tophet represent sacrifices. Others argue that only some of the infants found were sacrificed. Paolo Xella argues that "the principle of Occam's Razor" indicates that the weight of classical and biblical sources indicate that sacrifices occurred. He further argues that the number of children in the tophet is far smaller than the rate of natural infant mortality. In Xella's estimation, prenatal remains at the tophet are probably those of children who were promised to be sacrificed but died before birth, but who were nevertheless offered as a sacrifice in fulfillment of a vow. He concludes that

the tophet was not theatre of numberless massacres, but only of a certain number of sacred ceremonies felt as pious, and the bloody rite was the extrema ratio in critic [sic] situations (e.g. see the biblical cases). Moreover, it is assured that a lot of different ceremonies were performed in the tophet, included substitution rites (animal / human).

The legendary death of Carthage's first queen Elissa (Dido) by immolation, as well as the deaths of Hamilcar and the wife of Hasdrubal the Boetharch in the same manner, has been connected to the tophet ritual by some scholars. It is possible that the practice was more frequent in the earlier years of the city.

== See also ==
- Kupala Night - a traditional Slavic holiday that involves a ritual of young people jumping over the flames of bonfires

== Sources ==
- Ackerman, Susan (1993). "Topheth". In Metzger, Bruce M.; Coogan, Michael D. (eds.). The Oxford Companion to the Bible. Oxford University Press. ISBN 978-0-19-989102-3.
- Bauks, Michaela (2006). "The Theological Implications of Child Sacrifice in and beyond the Biblical Context in Relation to Genesis 22 and Judges 11". In Finsterbusch, Karin; Lange, Armin; Römheld, Diethard (eds.). Human Sacrifice in Judeo-Christian and Other Ancient Mediterranean Religions. Brill. pp. 57–77.
- Bonnet, Corrinne (2011). "On Gods and Earth: The Tophet and the Construction of a New identity in Punic Carthage". In Gruen, Erich Stephen (ed.). Cultural identity in the ancient Mediterranean. Getty Publications. pp. 373–387. ISBN 978-0-89236-969-0.
- Cooper, Alan M. (2005). "Phoenician Religion [first edition]". In Jones, Lindsay (ed.). Encyclopedia of Religion. Vol. 10 (2 ed.). Macmillan Reference. pp. 7128–7133.
- Dewrell, Heath D. (2017). Child sacrifice in ancient Israel. Eisenbrauns. ISBN 978-1-57506-494-9.
- Eusebius (1903). Eusebii Pamphili Evangelicae Praeparationis libri XV. Translated by Gifford, E. H. Oxford.
- Garnand, Brien K.; Greene, Joseph A. (2023). "Infants as votive offerings: Phoenician tophet precincts in context". Journal of Ancient History. 11 (2): 1-323. ISSN 2324-8106.
- Heider, G. C. (1999). "Moloch". In Toorn, Karel van der; Becking, Bob; Horst, Pieter W. van der (eds.). Dictionary of Deities and Demons in the Bible (2 ed.). Brill. pp. 581–585.
- Holm, Tawny L. (2005). "Phoenician Religion [Further Considerations]". In Jones, Lindsay (ed.). Encyclopedia of Religion. Vol. 10 (2 ed.). Macmillan Reference. pp. 7134–7135.
- Hoyos, Dexter (2021). Carthage: A Biography. Routledge. ISBN 978-1-138-78820-6.
- Kaufman, Steve (2007). "The Phoenician Inscription of the Incirli Trilingual: A Tentative Reconstruction and Translation". MAARAV. 14 (2): 7–26. doi:10.1086/MAR200714202. S2CID 257837087.
- Kerr, R.M. (2018). "In Search of the Historical Moloch". In Kerr, R.M.; Schmitz, Philip C.; Miller, Robert (eds.). "His Word Soars Above Him" Biblical and North-West Semitic Studies Presented to Professor Charles R. Krahmalkov. Ann Arbor. pp. 59–80.
- Kerr, R.M. (2020). "La gorge géhennique". Acta Ethnologica Danubiana (in French). 22: 37–54.
- King, Philip J. (1993). Jeremiah: An Archaeological Companion. Westminster John Knox Press. p. 136. ISBN 978-0-664-22443-1.
- McCarty, Matthew M. (2019). "The Tophet and Infant Sacrifice". In López-Ruiz, Carolina; Doak, Brian R. (eds.). The Oxford Handbook of the Phoenician and Punic Mediterranean. pp. 312–325. doi:10.1093/oxfordhb/9780190499341.013.21. ISBN 978-0-19-049934-1.
- Quinn, Josephine Crawley (2011). "The Cultures of the Tophet: Identification and Identity in the Phoenician Diaspora". In Gruen, Erich Stephen (ed.). Cultural identity in the ancient Mediterranean. Getty Publications. pp. 388–413. ISBN 978-0-89236-969-0.
- Quinn, Josephine Crawley (2019). "Phoenicians and Carthaginians in Greco-Roman Literature". In Lopez-Ruiz, Carolina; Doak, Brian R. (eds.). The Oxford Handbook of the Phoenician and Punic Mediterranean. Oxford University Press. pp. 671–685. doi:10.1093/oxfordhb/9780190499341.013.44. ISBN 978-0-19-049934-1.
- Reich, Bo (1993). "Gehenna". In Metzger, Bruce M.; Coogan, Michael D. (eds.). The Oxford Companion to the Bible. Oxford University Press. ISBN 978-0-19-989102-3.
- Schwartz, Jeffrey H.; Houghton, Frank; Macchiarelli, Roberto; Bondioli, Luca (2010). "Skeletal Remains from Punic Carthage Do Not Support Systematic Sacrifice of Infants". PLOS ONE. 5 (2) e9177. Bibcode:2010PLoSO...5.9177S. doi:10.1371/journal.pone.0009177. PMC 2822869. PMID 20174667.
- Schwartz, J.H.; et al. (2017). "Two tales of one city: data, inference and Carthaginian infant sacrifice" (PDF). Antiquity. 91 (356): 442–454. doi:10.15184/aqy.2016.270.
- Smith, P.; Avishai, G.; Greene, J.; Stager, L. (2011). "Aging Cremated Infants: The Problem of Sacrifice at the Tophet of Carthage". Antiquity. 85 (329): 859–874. doi:10.1017/S0003598X00068368. S2CID 162942793.
- Stager, Lawrence E.; Wolff, Samuel R. (January–February 1984). "Child Sacrifice at Carthage: Religious Rite or Population Control?" (PDF). Biblical Archaeology Review.
- Stavrakopoulou, Francesca (2013). "The Jerusalem Tophet Ideological Dispute and Religious Transformation". Studi Epigrafici e Linguistici. 30: 137–158.
- Warmington, B. H. (1995). "The Carthaginian Period". In Mokhtar, G. (ed.). General history of Africa. Vol. 2, Ancient civilizations of Africa. London: Heinemann. pp. 441–464.
- Xella, P. (2013). ""Tophet": an Overall Interpretation". In Xella, P. (ed.). The Tophet in the Ancient Mediterranean. Essedue. pp. 259–281.
- Xella, Paolo (2019). "Religion". In López-Ruiz, Carolina; Doak, Brian R. (eds.). The Oxford Handbook of the Phoenician and Punic Mediterranean. Oxford University Press. pp. 273–292. ISBN 978-0-19-049934-1.
