= Sostratus of Aegina =

6th century BC Greek merchant

Sostratos of Aegina (Greek: Σώστρατος ὁ Αιγινήτης), son of Laodamus, is reported by Herodotus as a famous merchant in the sixth century BC Hellenic world – indeed to have gained "the biggest profit any Greek trader we have reliable information about has ever made from his cargo".

== Veracity of Herodotus's account ==
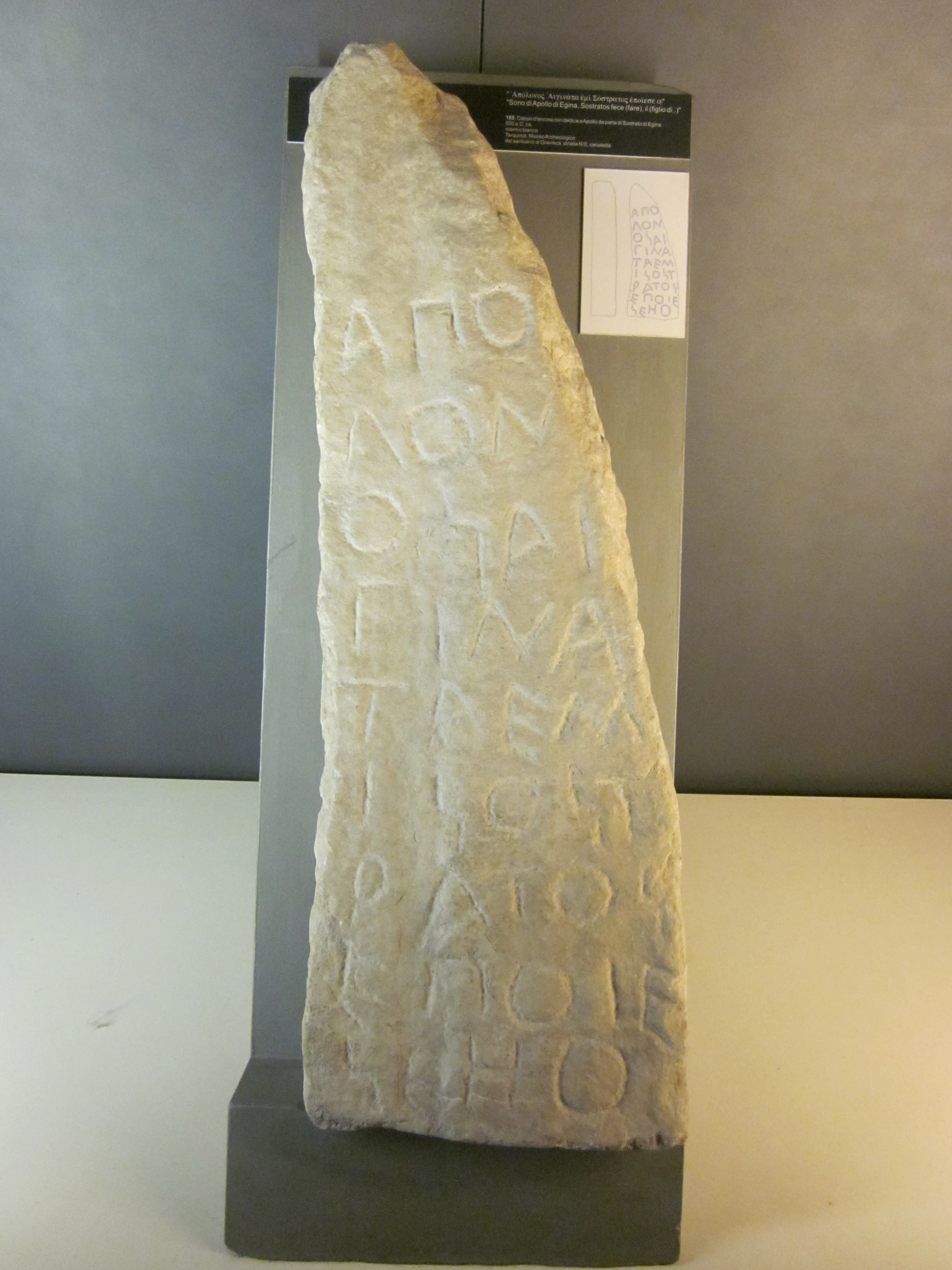
Stone anchor from Gravisca with the inscription ΑΠΟΛΟΝΟΣ ΑΙΓΙΝΑΤΑ ΕΜΙ ΣΟΣΤΡΑΤΟΣ ΕΠΟΙΗΣΕ ΗΟ, "I am of Apolo Aiginete. Made by Sostratos the (…)".

The veracity of Herodotus has often been challenged, both in ancient and modern times, and the instance of his casual reference to Sostratus as a well known presence is something of a test case. A previously otherwise unknown and perhaps legendary figure, Sostratus has received increasing validation from modern archeology. A stone anchor dedicated to Apollo at Gravisca (the port of the Etruscan city of Tarquinii) is for example thought to have been dedicated by Sostratos: it can now be seen at the museum there.

The names of Sostratus and Laodamus – perhaps his grandfather and father – have been found in Egypt, supporting the view of his coming from an important family of international Aegina traders. Moreover, clay storage jars are found throughout Etruscan archaeological sites of the period marked with the Aeginetan letters "SO", which may have stood for Sostratos, and are often presumed to be the packaging in which his goods were delivered. Not all scholars, however, accept that the marks on these jars refer to the Sostratos of Herodotus, and they (like the anchor) may again attest only to the kindred network, not the man. Nevertheless, the cumulative weight of confirmation for Herodotus as referring to a well-known figure in the Greek world is impressive.

== See also ==
- Colaeus
- Dick Whittington
