= Temple of Antas =

Ancient temple in Fluminimaggiore, Sardinia, Italy

Coordinates: 39.3940°N 8.5002°E

- Tempio di Antas
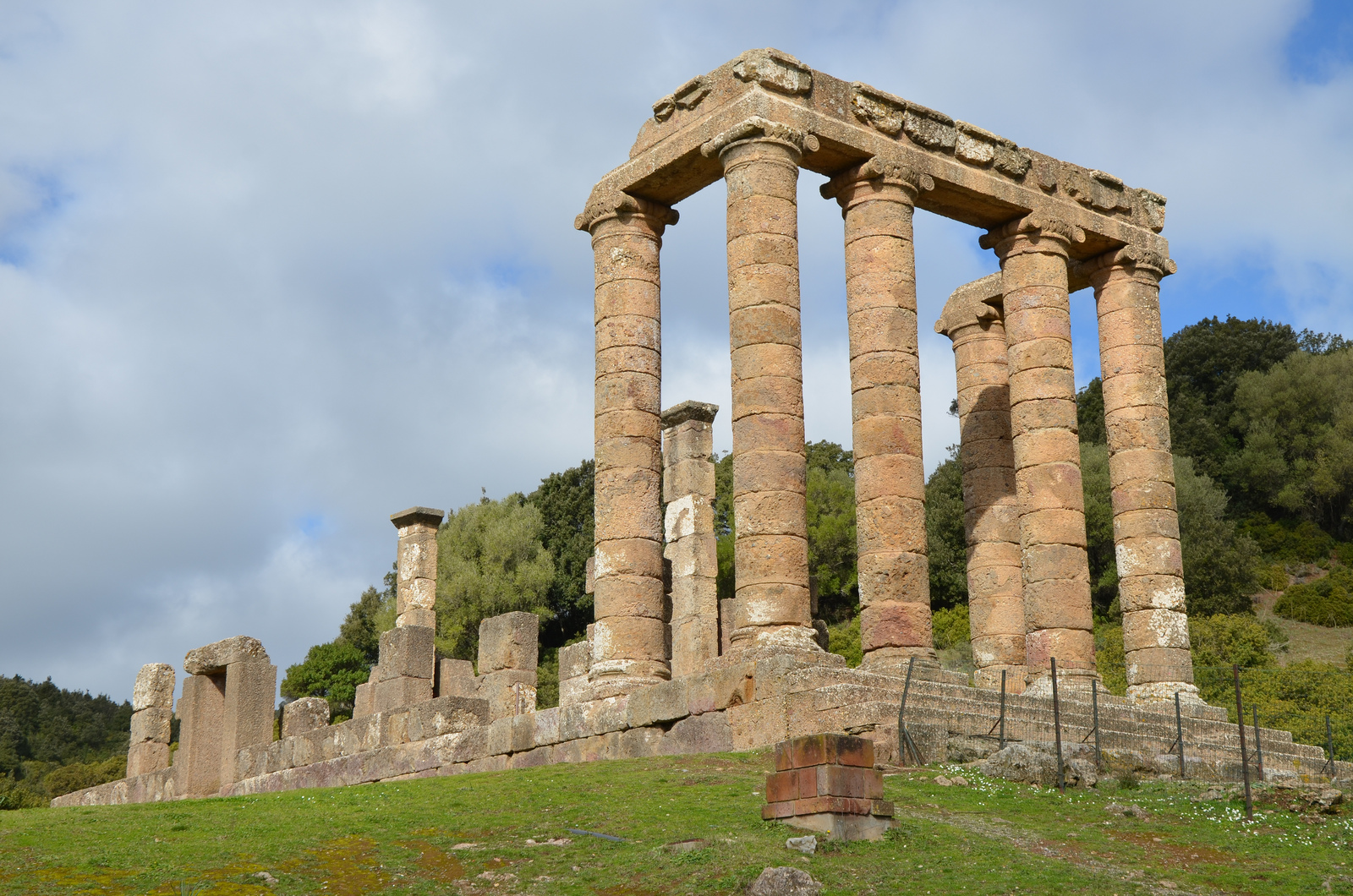
- The Temple of Antas

- Location within Sardinia
- Type: Monument
- Cultures: Punic civilization Roman civilization

Site notes
- Excavation dates: yes
- Condition: ruined
- Management: I Beni Culturali della Sardegna
- Public access: yes
- Website: Sassari, Fluminimaggiore, tempio di Antas (in Italian)

The Temple of Antas is an ancient Carthaginian temple in the commune of Fluminimaggiore, southern Sardinia, Italy. It is located in an area colonised by the Carthaginians and then by the Romans, attracted by its silver and lead deposits.

It consists of a Roman temple, under whose steps are the remains of the Carthaginian one, which was dedicated to the god Sid Addir, a later incarnation of the local god Sardus Pater Babai, the main male divinity of the Nuragic civilization.

The original temple had been built around 500 BC over a sacred limestone outcrop, and restored around 300 BC. The Roman temple was built by emperor Augustus (27 BC - 14 AD) and restored under Caracalla (213-217 AD).

Its remains were discovered in 1836 by general Alberto La Marmora, and rebuilt to the current status in 1967.

The fore section of the temple includes six columns, with a height of some 8 metres, with Ionic capitals. Originally a triangular pediment was also present. The cella was accessed through two side openings and had a mosaic-covered pavement, part of which has been preserved. The temple was provided with two square reservoirs, which housed the water for the sacred rites of purification.

It is likely that a statue of the Sardus Pater was housed in the cella. According to the size of the only remain found, a finger, it has been estimated that it was some 3 metres high.

The archaeological area of temple includes a small necropolis, remains of an ancient Nuragic village (13th-10th centuries BC), Roman quarries of limestone and an ancient path connecting the temple to a sacred cave where the water cult was practised.
