= Habis =

Legendary king of Tartessos

King of Tartessos
- Reign: ? - 625 BC
- Predecessor: Gargoris
- Successor: Arganthonios
- Born: Tartessos, Hispania
- Died: Tartessos, Hispania

Habis (from the Cynete language meaning fawn) is a legendary king of the Spanish region of Tartessos. The only source of the legend of Habis and his father Gargoris is the work Epitome by Justin, who copied it from the now lost work Philippic Histories by Gnaeus Pompeius Trogus.

== History ==
According to legend, Habis's story began when his mother was stung by a bee. Her father, Gargoris, the king of Tartessos, hurried to heal her. As he knelt to soften her wound with his mouth, a passion came over both, thus procreating the baby. Due to the shame of having committed incest, the king ordered the child to be abandoned on the prairies outside the kingdom. Eventually the boy was raised by the deer in there, acquiring deer features. He was later found and recognized as the true heir to the kingdom, and later accordingly named.
