= Monte Sirai =

Archeological site in Italy

- Monte Sirai
- Map of the archaeological site

- Location within Italy
- 39°10′48″N 8°29′10″E
- Type: Settlement
- Cultures: Phoenician, Punic, Roman
- Location: Carbonia, Sardinia, Italy
- Region: Sardinia

History
- Built: 8th century BC

Site notes
- Management: Soprintendenza per i Beni Archeologici per le province di Cagliari e Oristano
- Public access: Yes

Monte Sirai is an archaeological site near Carbonia, in the province of South Sardinia, Sardinia, Italy. It is a settlement built at the top of a hill by the Phoenicians of Sulci (today's Sant'Antioco). The history of studies in Monte Sirai has a very precise date: the fall of 1962, when a local boy casually found a female figure carved on a stele of the tophet. Following further inspections, in August 1963, the local Soprintendenza and the Institute of Near Eastern Studies of the Sapienza University of Rome started excavations, leading to a fairly comprehensive study of the entire town.

== History ==
Given the excellent location of the hill, the site was inhabited since the Neolithic age. Some nuragic towers witness an important anthropization in the first half of the II millennium BC. The first Phoenician records date back to 730 BC circa, at the same time of other coastal cities of Sardinia. The town is built around the so-called mastio, a sacred place that undergone several renovations, perhaps with defensive function. The discovery of a statue of the goddess Astarte (now in the National Museum of Cagliari), discovered in 1964, confirms a use of religious type.

The town was affected by the Carthaginian conquest in the 6th century BC. A dozen new families settled subsequently in Monte Sirai, as witnessed by many hypogeum-tombs of Punic types; the rite of cremation, prevalent during the Phoenician period, was substituted by the entombment. The city wall was strengthened around 375 BC, roughly the period of appearance of the first local tophet. A subsequent restoration of the fortifications was carried out after the First Punic War; under the Roman rule all the military facilities were dismantled. Around 110 BC the site was inexplicably abandoned. Subsequent frequentations are witnessed by some Constantinian era coins found in the tophet area.

== Ancient DNA ==
According to a study published in 2018, ancient Phoenician DNA found in the settlement suggests that there was integration and cultural assimilation between Sardinians and Phoenicians in Monte Sirai.

== Gallery ==
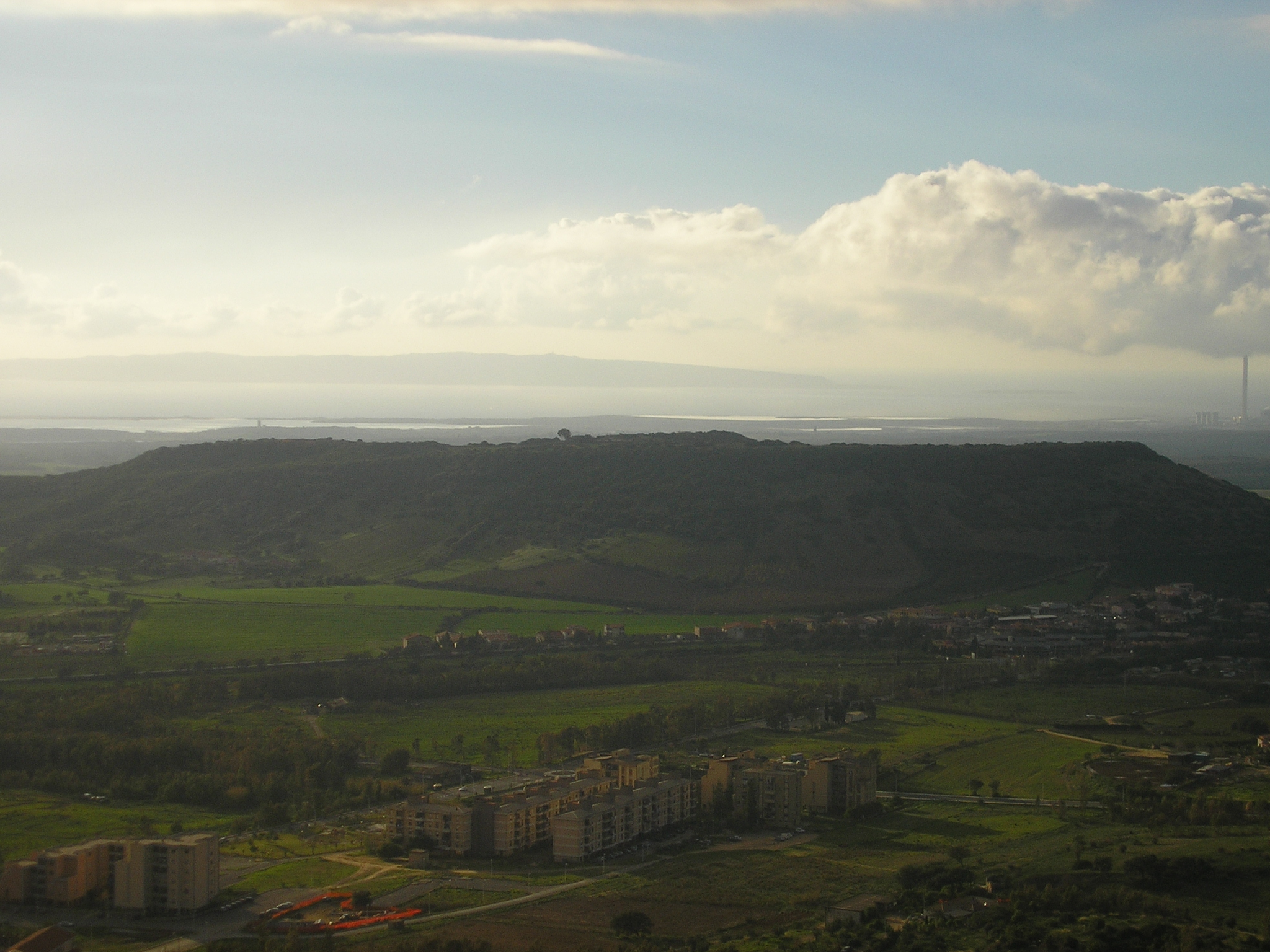
Monte Sirai

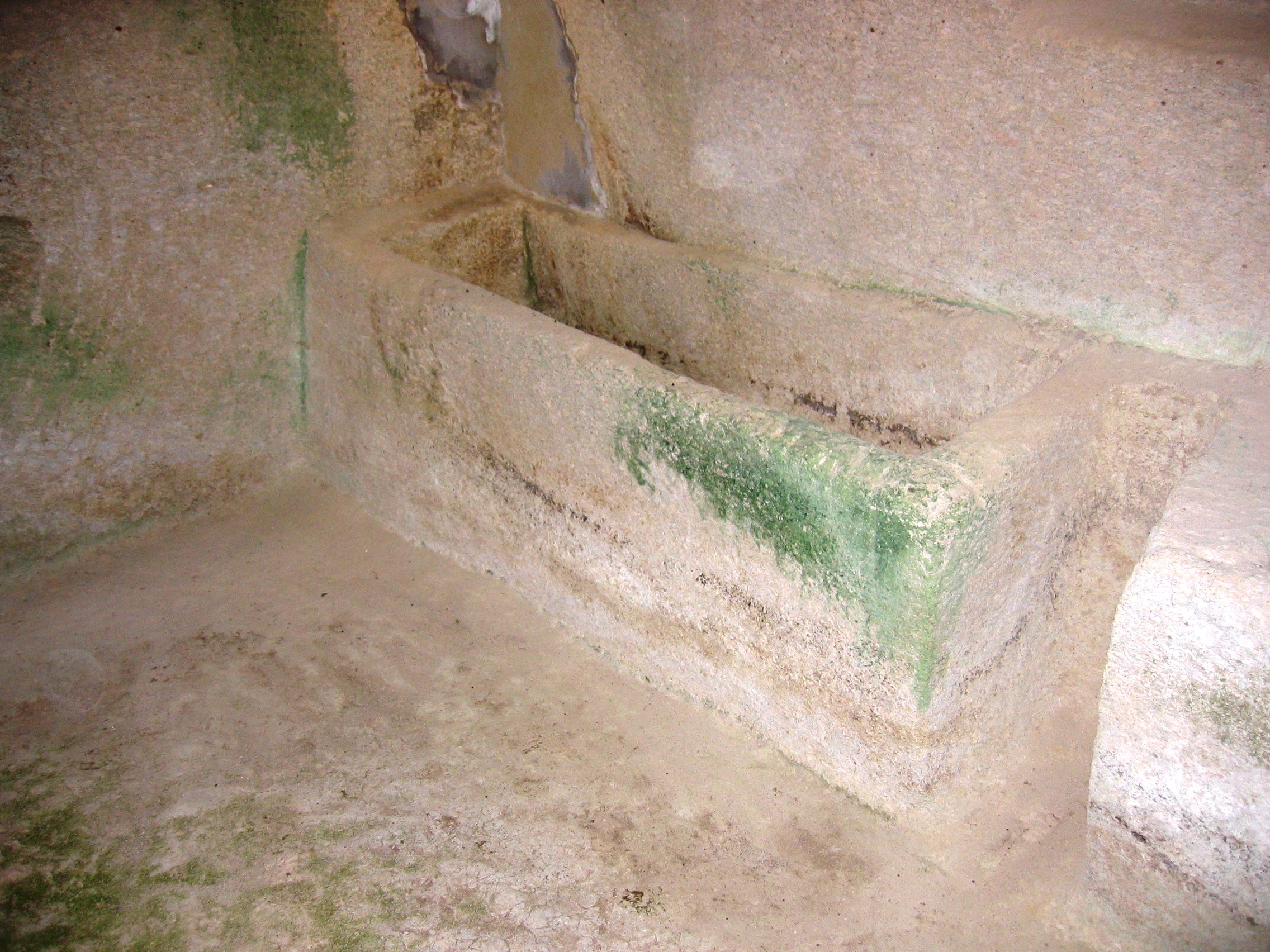
Punic hypogeum

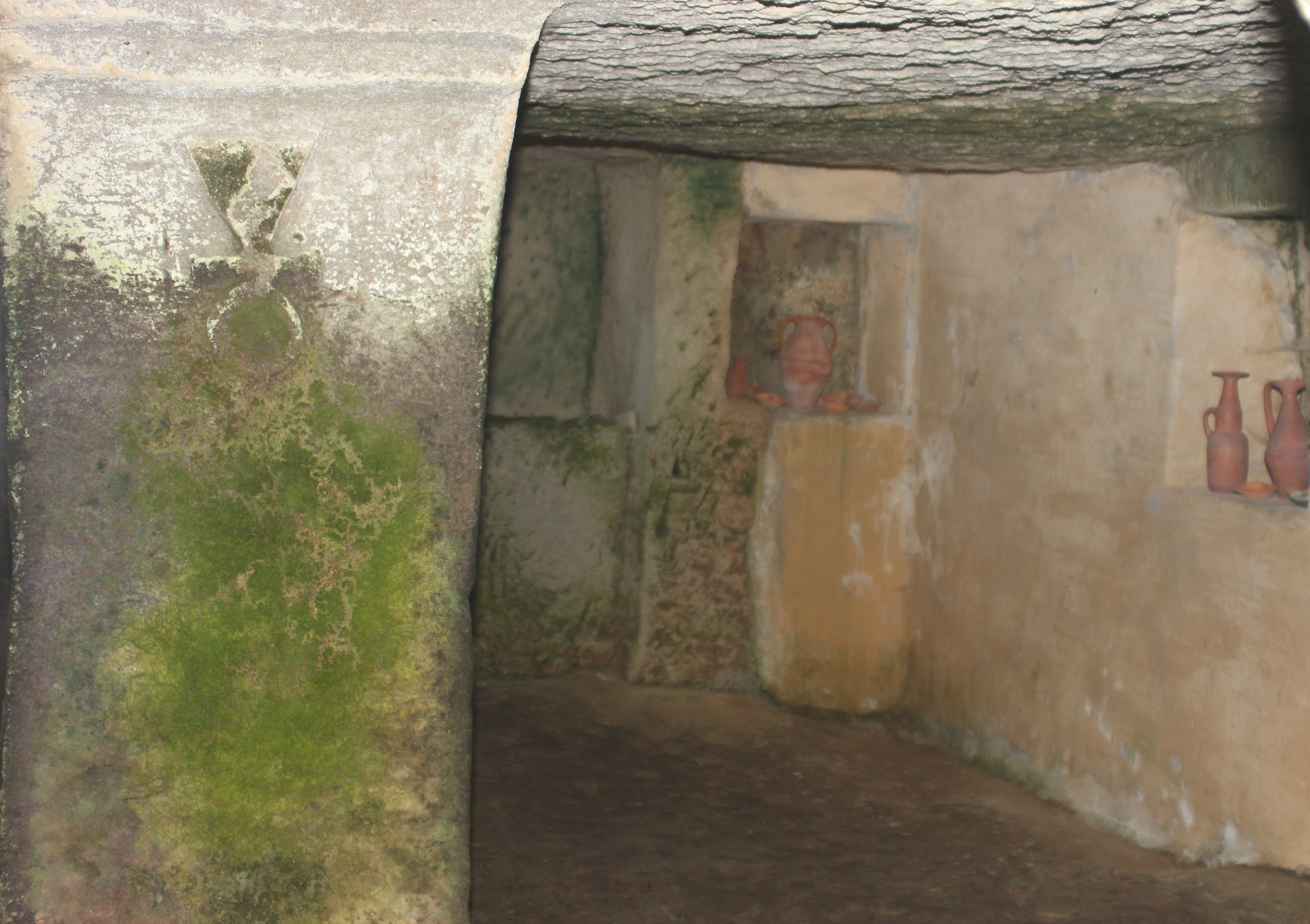

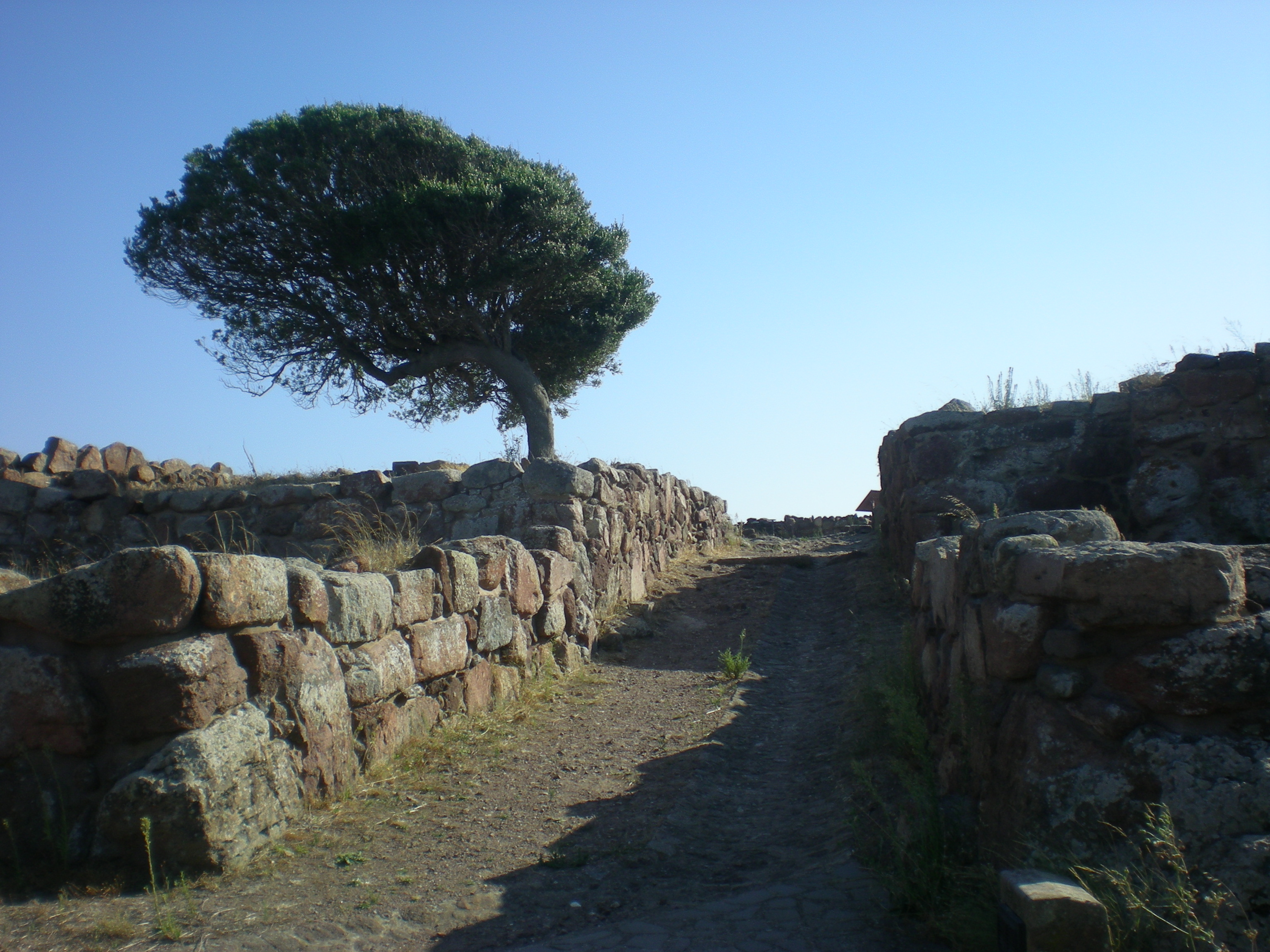

== Bibliography ==
- P. Bernardini, Le origini di Sulcis e Monte Sirai, in Studi di egittologia e di antichità puniche, 4, 1989, pp. 45–66;
- P. Bartoloni, Monte Sirai: genesi di un insediamento, in Incontro "I Fenici", Cagliari, Regione Autonoma della Sardegna, 1990, pp. 31–36;
- P. Bartoloni-S.F. Bondì-L.A. Marras, Monte Sirai, collana " Itinerari", Roma, Istituto Poligrafico e Zecca dello Stato, 1992;
- P. Bartoloni, L'impianto urbanistico di Monte Sirai nell'età repubblicana, in Atti del X Convegno di studio "L'Africa Romana" (Oristano, 11-13 dicembre 1992), Sassari, Gallizzi, 1994, pp. 817–829;
- P. Bartoloni, La necropoli di Monte Sirai, Roma, Istituto per la civiltà fenicia e punica, 2000;
- Monte Sirai. Le opere e i giorni, a cura di P. Bernardini, C. Perra, Carbonia, 2001;
- P. Bartoloni, Monte Sirai 1999-2000. Nuove indagini nell'insula B, in Rivista di Studi Fenici, 30, 2002, pp. 41–46;
