= Sardus =

Mythological hero of the Nuragic Sardinians

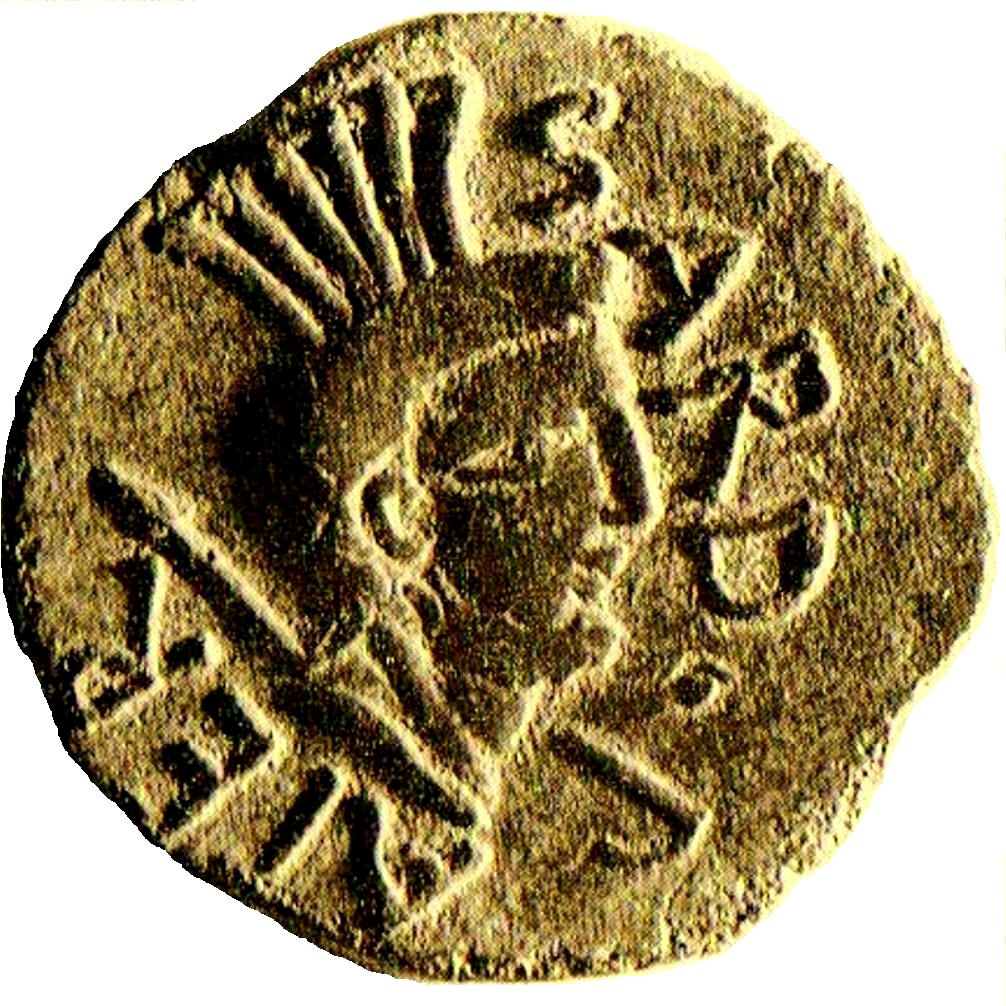
Depiction of Sardus Pater in a Roman Provincial coin minted in Sardinia during the late Roman Republic

Sardus (Ancient Greek: Σάρδος, romanized: Sardos), also Sid Addir and Sardus Pater ("Sardinian Father") was the eponymous mythological hero of the Nuragic Sardinians. Sardus appears in the writings of various classical authors, like Sallust, Solinus and Pausanias.

According to Sallust, Sardus son of Hercules, left Libya along with a great multitude of men and occupied the island of Sardinia, which was so named after him. Later Pausanias confirms the story of Sallust and in the second century CE writes that Sardus was the son of Makeris (identifiable with Mecur / Macer, a Libyan name deriving from the Berber imɣur "to grow"), and that the island of Sardinia changed its name from Ichnusa to Sardinia in honor of Sardus. Makeris is likely identifiable with Melqart, whom Pausanias and classical authors identified as the "Heracles" of Libyans and Egyptians.

== See also ==
- Temple of Antas
- Sherden
- Norax
- Iolaus
