= Gargoris =

Legendary king of Tartessos

King of Tartessos
- Reign: ?
- Predecessor: Norax
- Successor: Habis
- Born: Tartessos, Hispania
- Died: Tartessos, Hispania

Gargoris was a mythical king of the Cynetes, considered part of the people of Tartessos, and, according to legend, the inventor of beekeeping.

He exiled his own son, Habis, who was adopted by a female deer and saved from the sea, and who later inherited the kingdom.
