= Phoenician votive inscriptions =

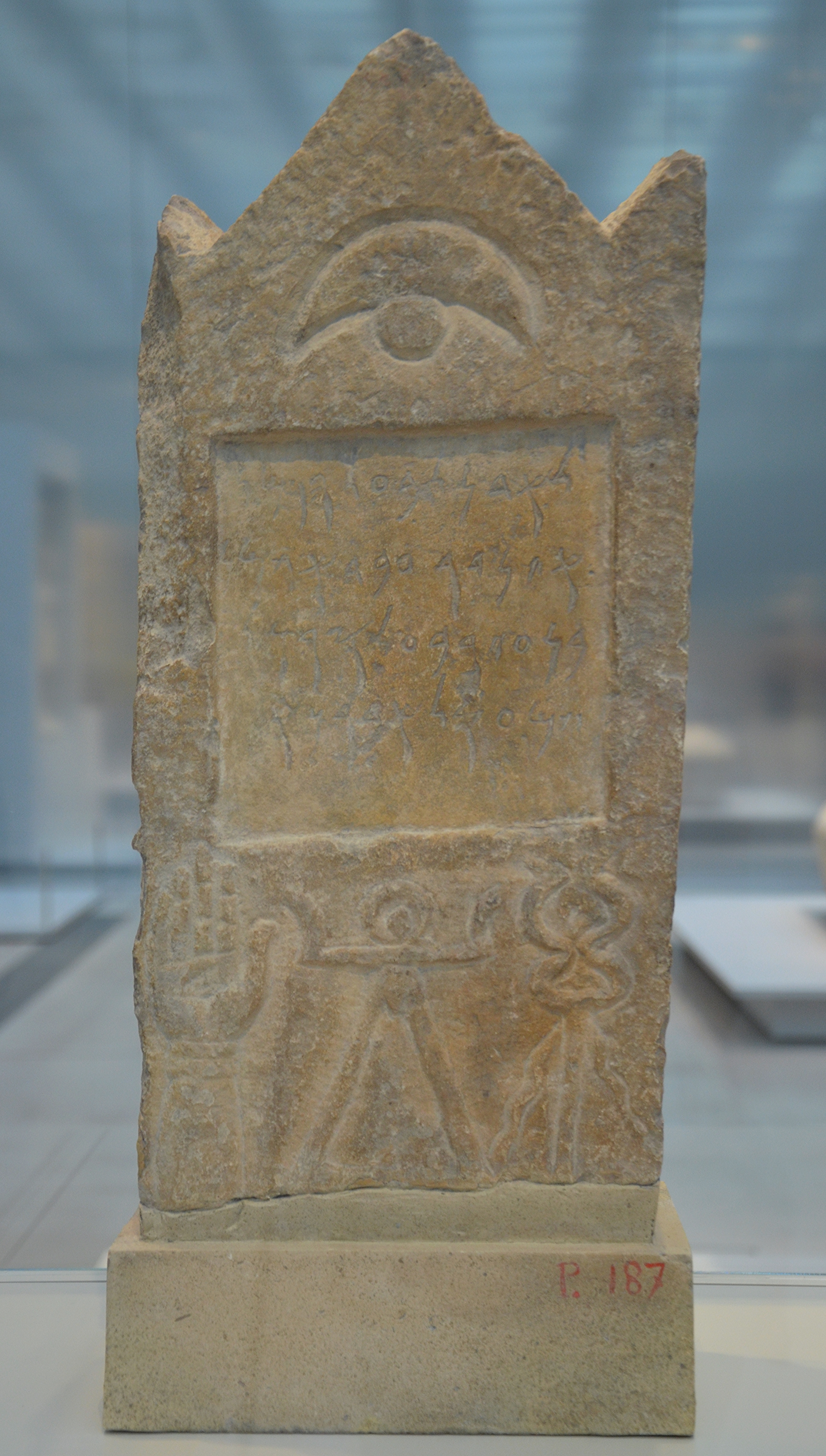
A Phoenician votive inscription on one of Cirta steles, near symbols of crescent, Tinnit, Caduceus and a spread right hand

Phoenician votive inscriptions or Punic votive inscriptions are votive inscriptions in the Phoenician and Punic religion, dedicated to a certain god or gods, mostly on stelae. The inscriptions have a standard formula, including the name of the god (or gods), the statement of the vow, the name of the vower and a closing statement. Most of the inscriptions were found in Carthage, and dedicated to Tinnit, Baʿal Ḥammon or both.

== The standard formula ==
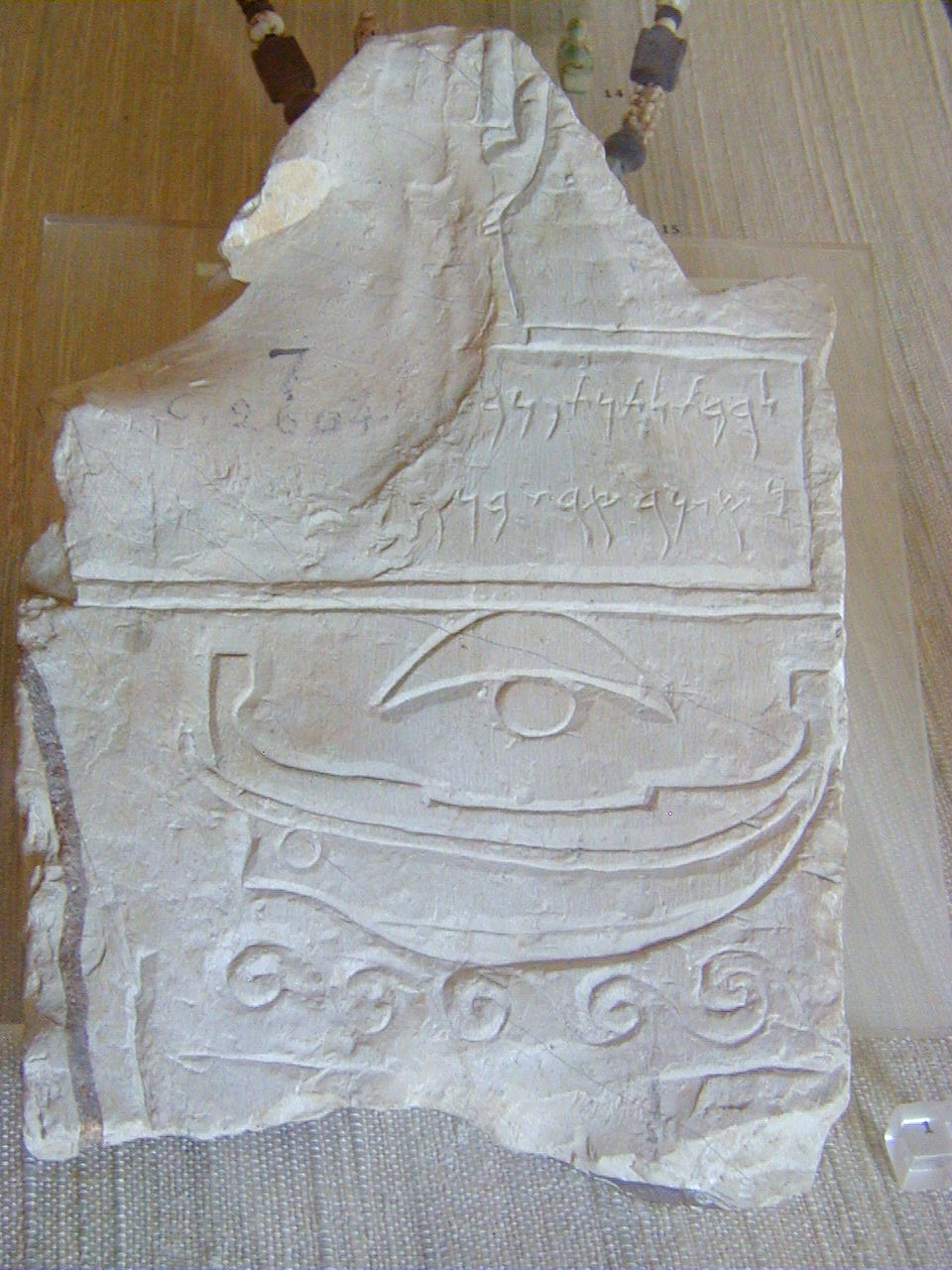
A Phoenician votive inscription on a fragment of a stele with a crescent and a ship over waves

Most of the inscriptions are written in the exact same formula. This formula opens with the dedication to the god or gods (for example: LRBT LTNT PN BʿL WLʾDN LBʿL ḤMN = "To the lady - to Tinnit the face of Baal, and to the lord - to Baal Hammon"). After the dedication, the statement of the vow (ʾŠ NDR = "which devoted", "which vowed") and the name (and his/her ancestry, and sometimes the employment as well) appears (for example: ʾŠ NDR MHRBʿL HSPR BN BDʿŠTRT BN MLKYTN BN ʾDRBʿL = "which Meherbaal the writer son of Bodastart son of Milkyathon son of Addirbaal devoted"). In quite a few cases the inscriptions end with a closing statement to the god/gods (K ŠMʿ QLʾ BRKʾ or K ŠMʿ QLʾ YBRKʾ = "for he/she/they (the go/gods) heard his/her (the vower) voice, may he/she/they bless him/her", or simply K ŠMʿ QLʾ BRKʾ = "for he/she/they heard his/her voice", and other close variations), but it is frequently absent.

=== Exceptions ===
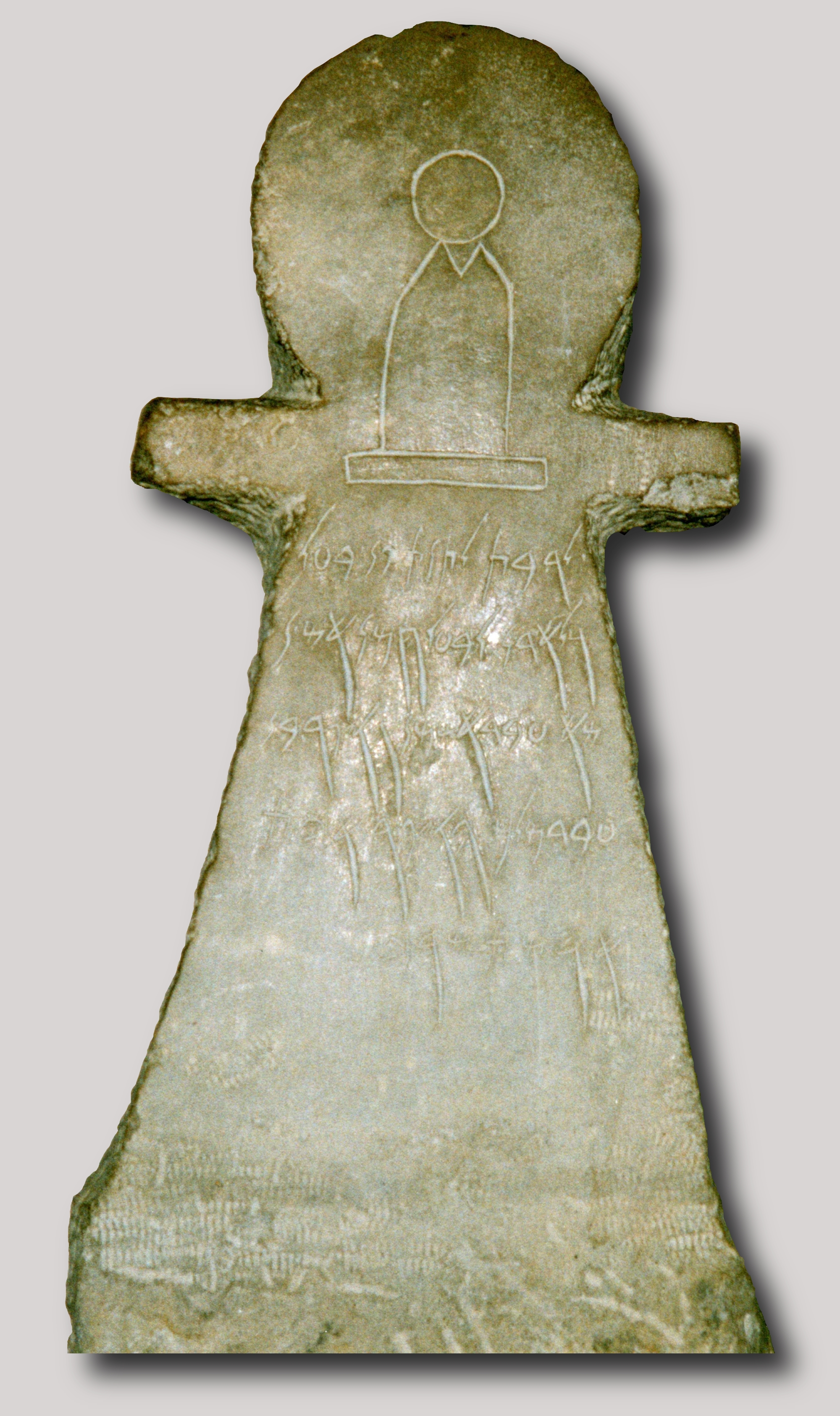
A stele in the shape of sign of Tinnit, bearing an inscription with ʾŠ NŠʾ ("which raised up")

Most of the inscriptions include a general dedication (the ʾŠ NDR part), but a minority of them include a certain specific vowed object(s): obelisks and masks, copper altar, wooden cart/carts/female calf, et cetera. Some of the inscriptions describe the stele of the vowed object as a gift, mostly in the version ʾŠ YTN ("which gave", as opposed to ʾŠ NDR) or with MTNT ("gift"), and some mix both the gift and the vow versions. Some inscriptions are made in an extremely short formula, including only the vower's name and the word NDR (as a noun – "the vow of") or MTNT ("the gift of"). The closing statement rarely appears as "for he/she/they heard the voice of his words". There are also some exceptions in the order of the parts of the standard formula. A few inscriptions warn a potential thief that Tinnit or Baal Hammon, to whom the stelae were dedicated, will punish him.

=== Examples ===
An inscription written in a standard formula:

[L]RBT LTNT PN BʿL WLʾD[N]	[To] the lady, to Tinnit-face-of-Baal, and to the lor[d,]
LBʿL ḤMN ʾŠ NDR MHRBʿL	to Baal Hammon, thus vowed Meherbaal
HSPR BN BDʿŠTRT BN MLK[Y]	the writer, son of Bodastart, son of Milk[ya]-
TN BN ʾDRBʿL K ŠMʿ QLʾ BRKʾ	-ton, for they heard his voice. May they bless him!

A Phoenician votive inscription written in Greek transliteration:

ΛΑΔΟΥΝ ΛΥΒΑΛ ΑΜΟΥΝ ΟΥ	To the lord, to Baal Hammon, and
ΛΥΡΥΒΑΘΩΝ ΘΙΝΙΘ ΦΑΝΕ ΒΑΛ	to our lady, to Tinnit-face-of-Baal,
ΥΣ ΝΑΔΩΡ ΣΩΣΙΠΑΤΙΟΣ ΒΥΝ	thus vowed Sosipatios, son of
ΖΟΠΥΡΟΣ ΣΑΜΩ ΚΟΥΛΩ ΒΑ	Zopyros, (for) they heard his voice. May they bl-
ΡΑΧΩ

A second inscription, according to which the stele was erected as a gift, and not as a result of a vow, reads:

LʾDN LBʿL ḤMN WRBTN TNT	To the lord, to Baal Hammon, and our Lady, Tinnit-
PʿN BʿL MTNT ʾŠ ṬNʾ	-face-of-Baal, a gift which erected
YḤWʾLN BN ʿBDʾŠMN	Yehawalon, son of Abdeshmun
K ŠMʿ QLʾ BRKʾ	for they heard his voice. May they bless him!

== Distribution ==
More than 3,000 votive inscriptions were found In Carthage itself. Outside Carthage, Phoenician votive inscription were also found in Hadrumetum (Hadrumetum Punic inscriptions), Cirta (Cirta steles), Malta (Cippi of Melqart), San Nicolò Gerrei (Pauli Gerrei trilingual inscription), Sulci, Karaly, in Phoenicia proper, and in Hammon. Inscriptions in similar formulas were found in Sidon, near Tyre, in Athens, Rhodes, Egypt, Kition and Idalion, as well as unstandard versions in Carthage. Outside Carthage, the vows to gods other than Tinnit and Baal Hammon.

Based on an inscription bearing the standard formula without the name of the vower, as well as a Phoenician standard votive inscription with the name of the vower in Greek alphabet, it is assumed that the stelae with the standard formula were manufactured in large quantities, and only when someone was to by a stele as a result of a vow he vowed, their name was added.

== Symbolism ==
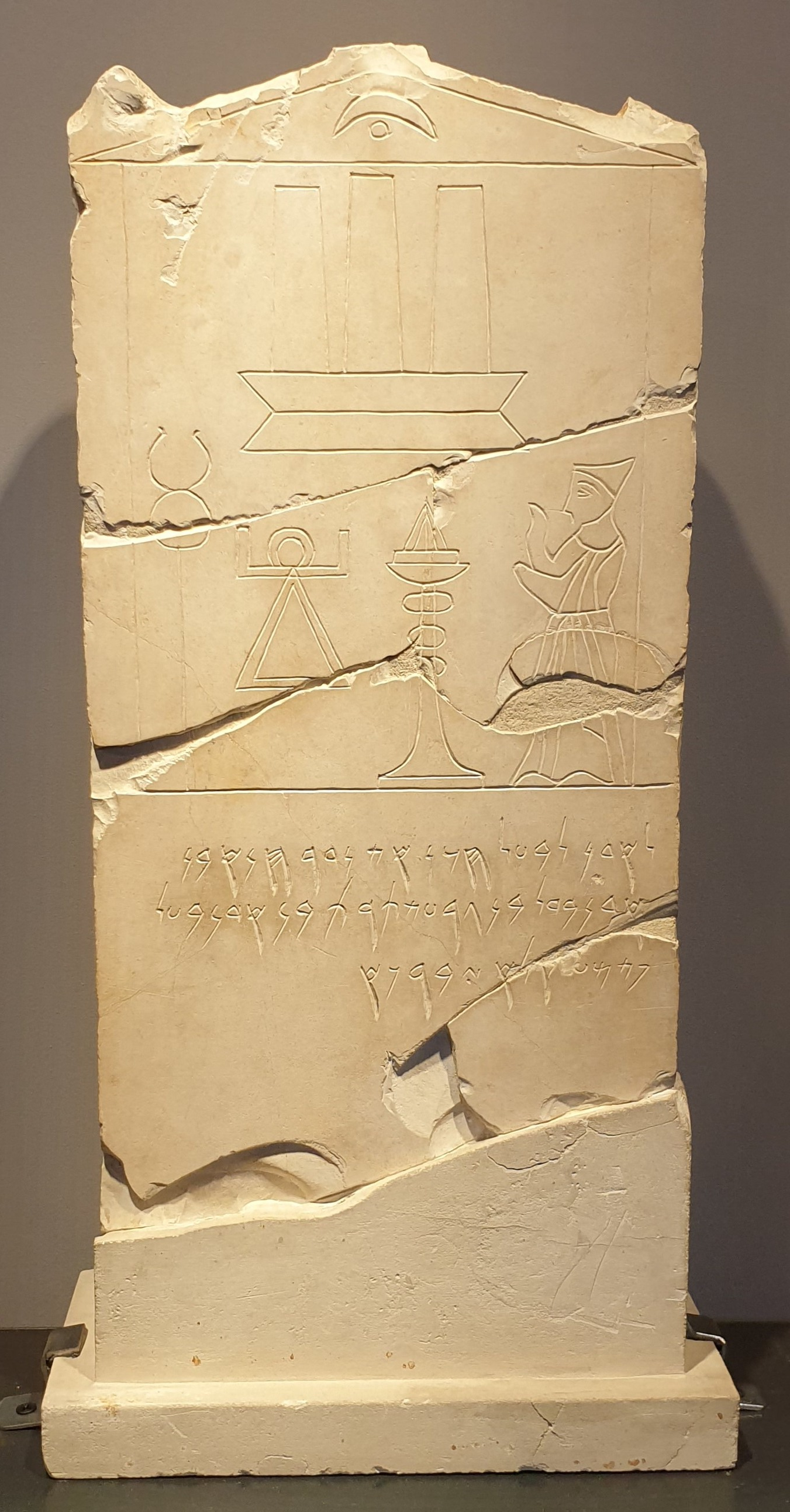
Lilybaeum stele, showing a votive inscription, symbols of Tinnit and Baal Hammon, Caduceus, an incense burner, a Priest spreads his hand up, and a line of stelae on a stage, similar to the stelae found in Hazor

The stelae themselves were mostly artistic and stylized, and various decorations and religious symbols are engraved on them, often related to the content of the inscriptions. The most common symbols are Sign of Tinnit, a crescent with a disc, a hand or two spread up, and Caduceus. The first sign, called "Sign of Tinnit", symbolizes according to most researchers the goddess Tinnit; her common epithet, PN BʿL appears as ΦΑΝΗΒΑΛΟΣ on a coin from Ashkelon near the symbol of Tinnit. The second symbol, a crescent with a disc, is the symbol of Baʿal Ḥammon; it appears on stelae dedicated to both Tinnit and Baal Hammon or only to Baal Hammon, but does not appear on stelae dedicated only to Tinnit. Moreover, the symbol appears on stelae from Samʼal, on which Baal Hammon is mentioned (like Kilamuwa stele). The Caduceus might symbolize both gods in some sort of a joint cult, but it exact meaning remains unknown.

The epithet PN BʿL ("the face of Baal") is reflected on Punic masks of faces from Carthage, featuring the symbol of Baal Hammon on them, literally the "face of Baal" – PN BʿL. Some of the characteristics of this cult are tied to the Canaanite cult in Hazor, where (in its Orthostat temple) a stele, with a crescent with a disc and two hand spread ur towards them, was found. In the courtyard of the temple's workshop, a clay mask with no beard or mustache was found, similar to the Punic masks.

Lilybaeum stele, which was found near Motya – a Punic governmental centre in Sicily, bears a votive inscription, as well as symbols of Tinnit and Baal Hammon, Caduceus, an incense burner and a Priest spreads his right hand up, as well as a depiction of a line of stelae on a stage, similar to the stelae found in Hazor.

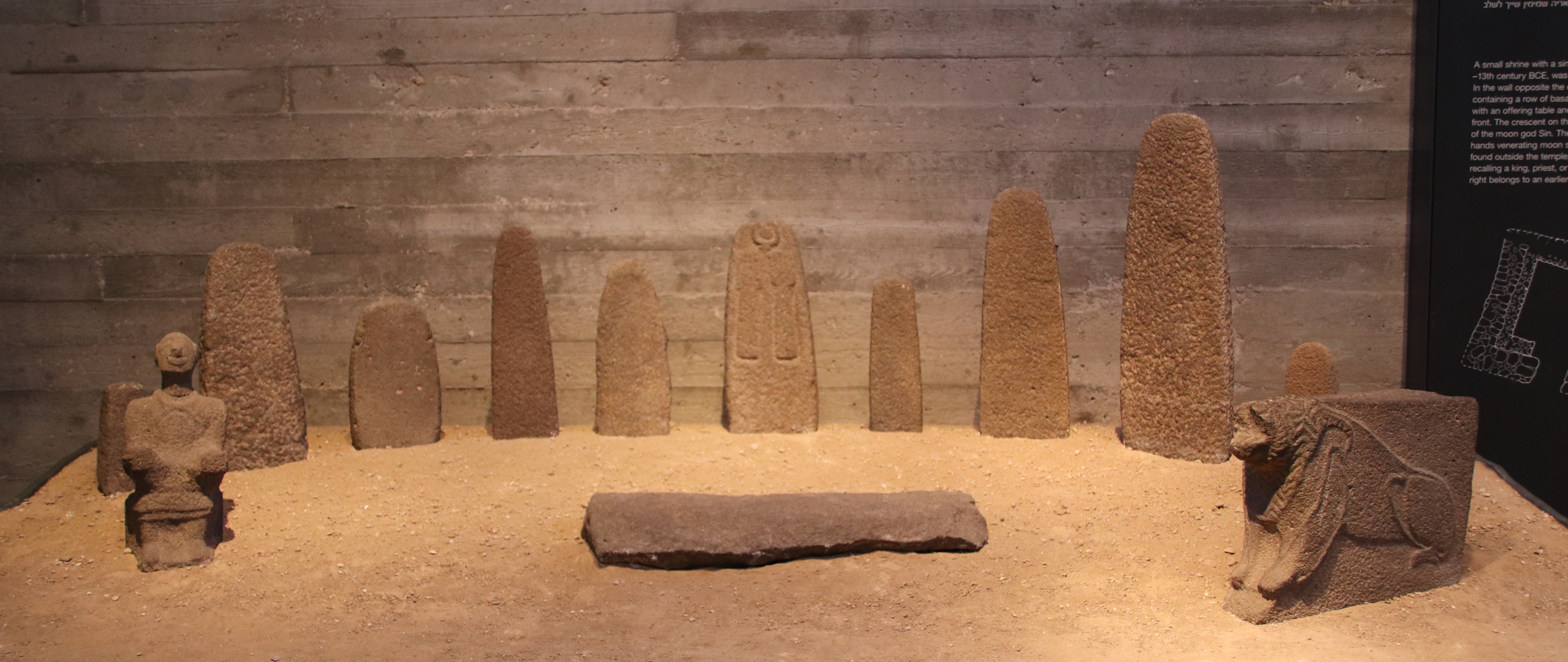
Stelae and statues from Orthostat temple in Hazor. The crescent stele is in the niddle of the line

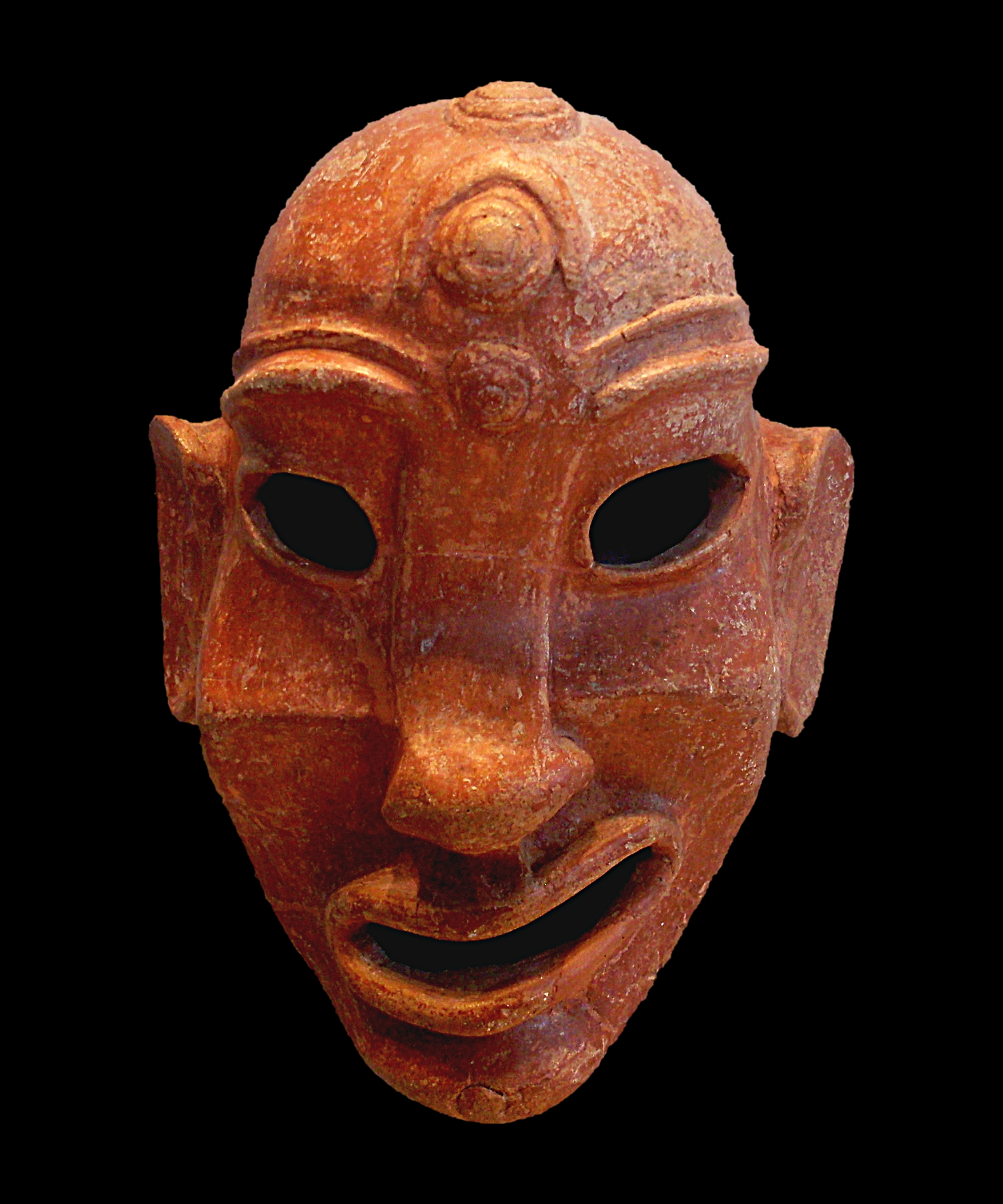
A Punic mask of a face featuring the symbol of Baal Hammon

== Gallery ==
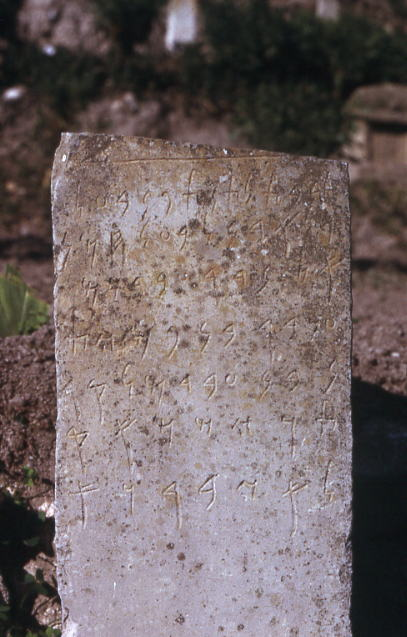

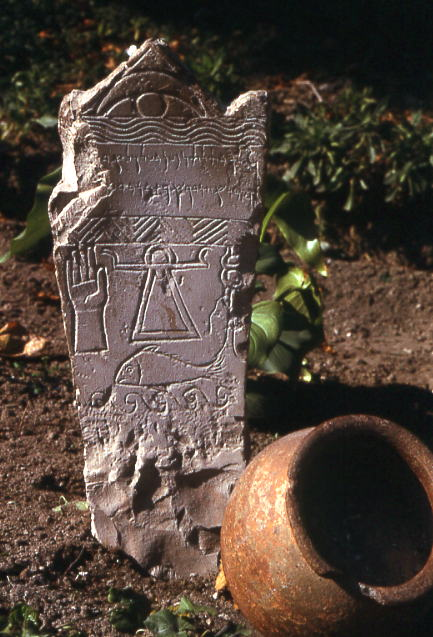

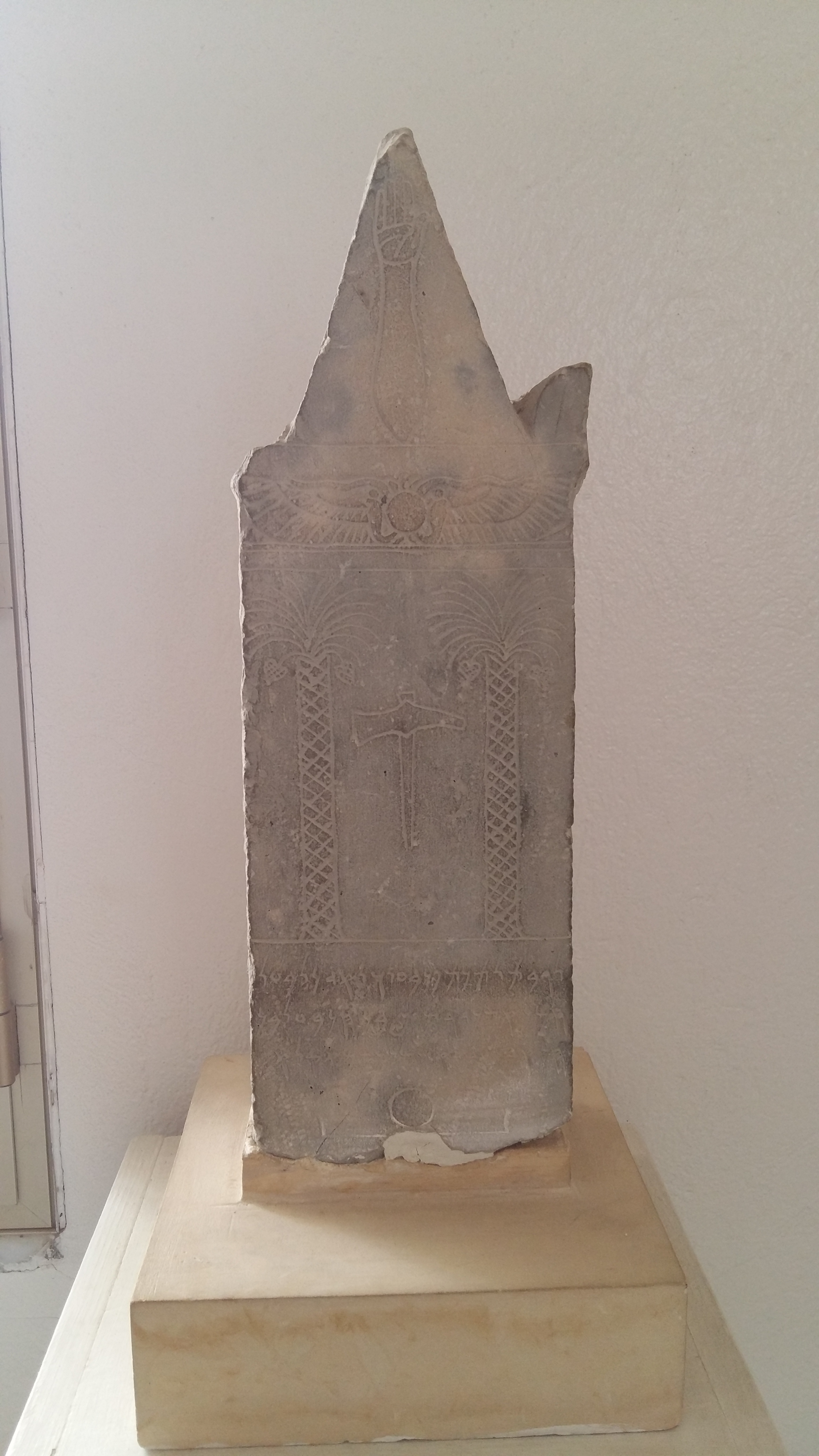

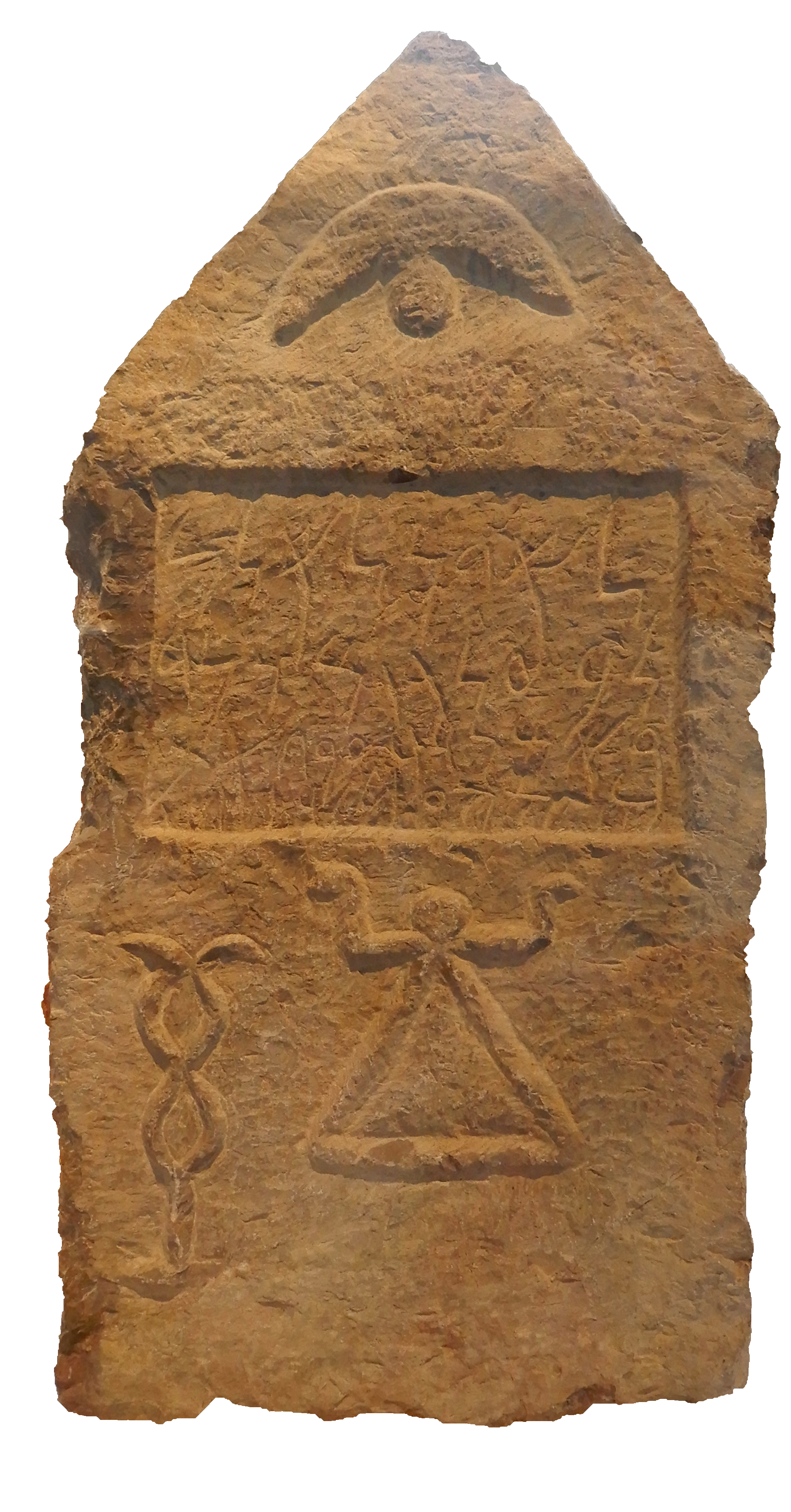

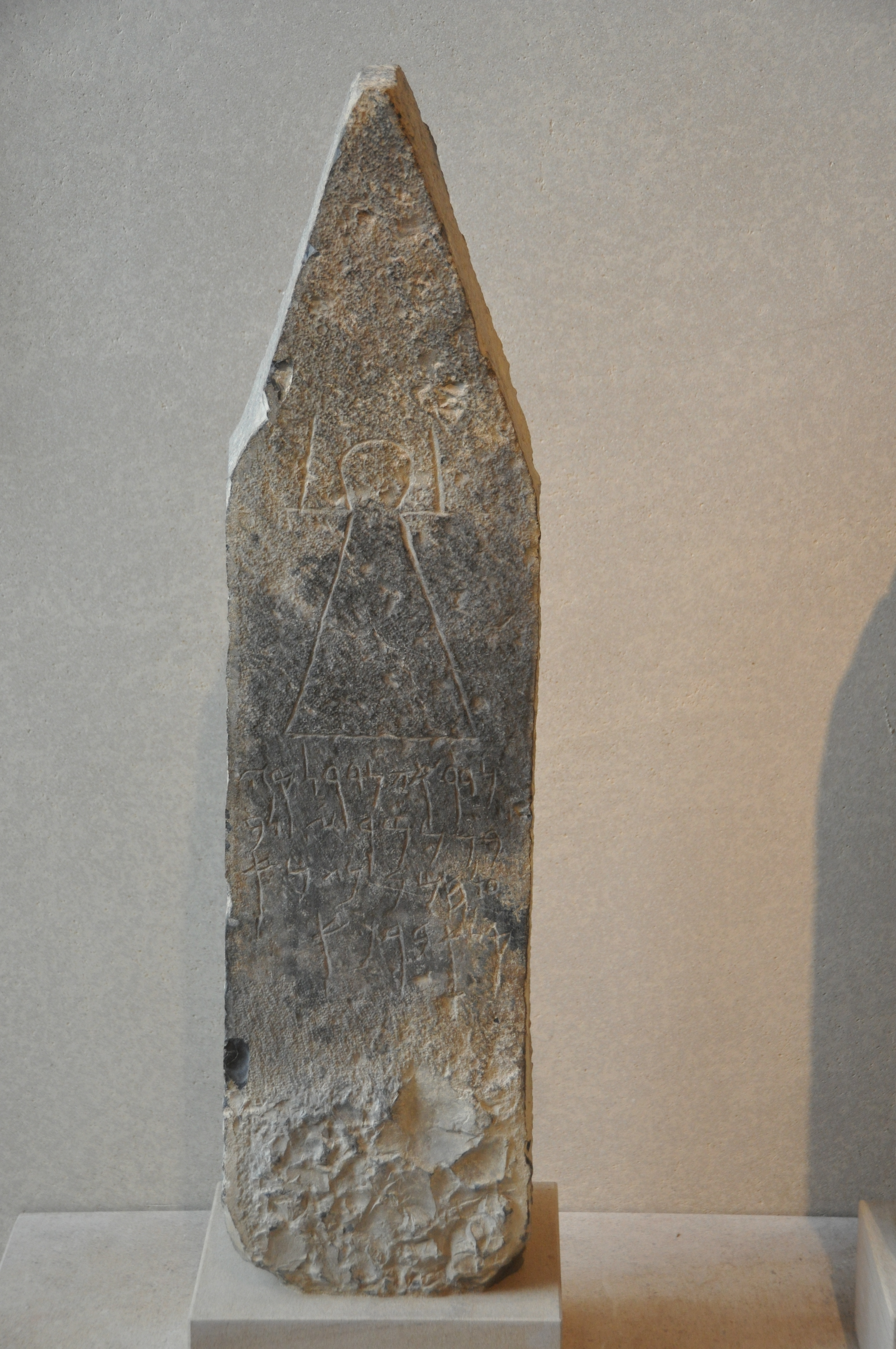

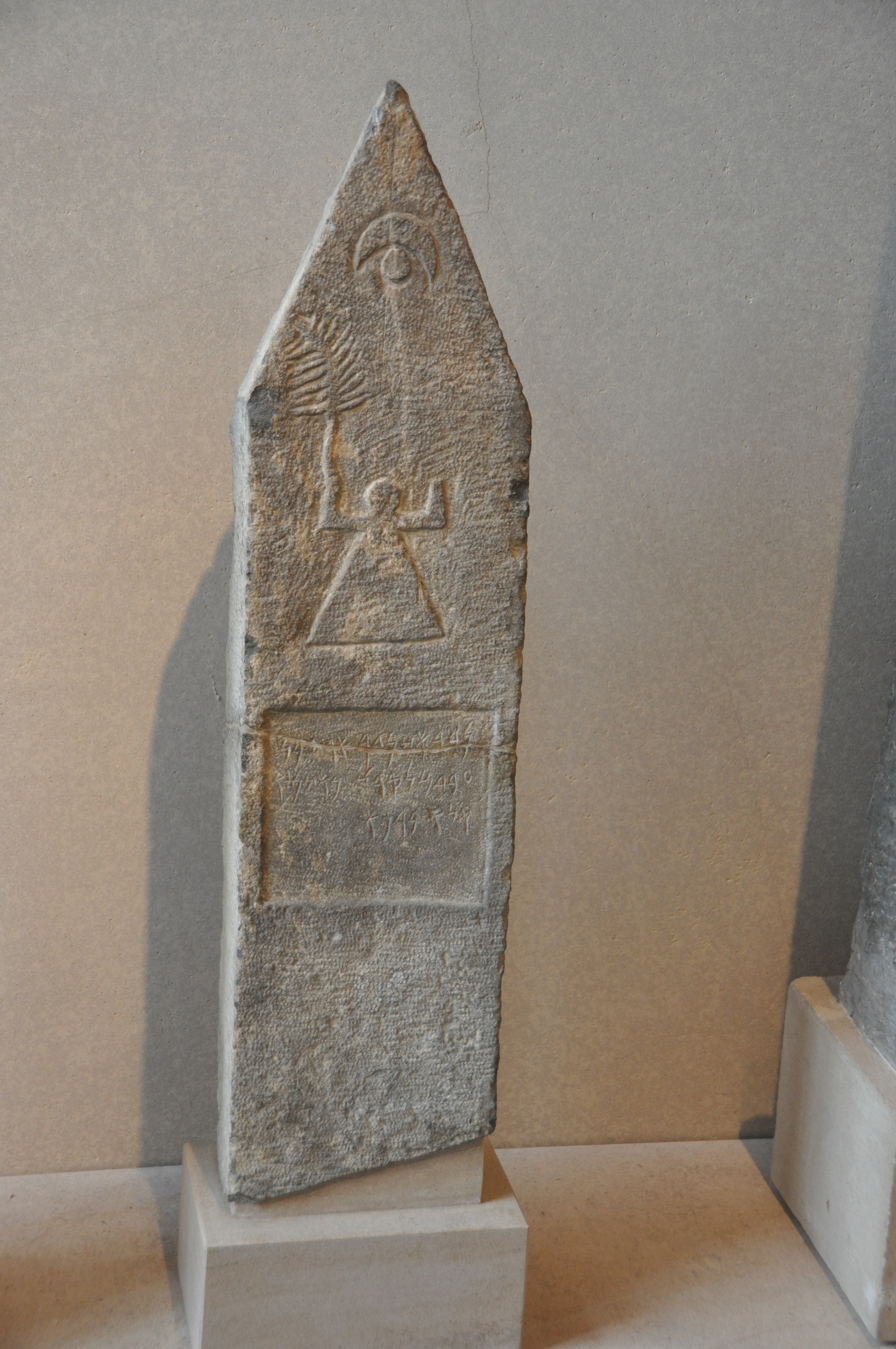

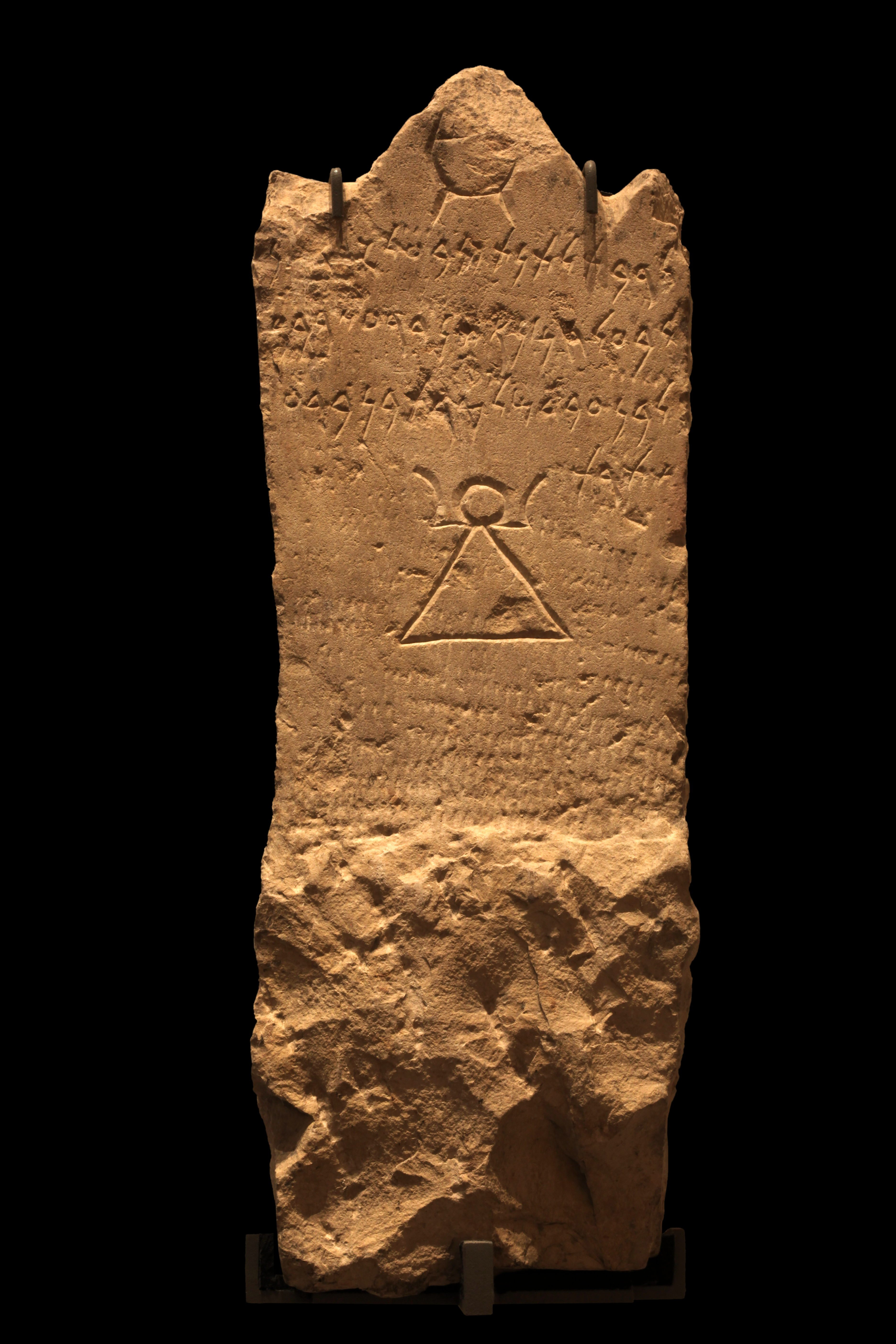

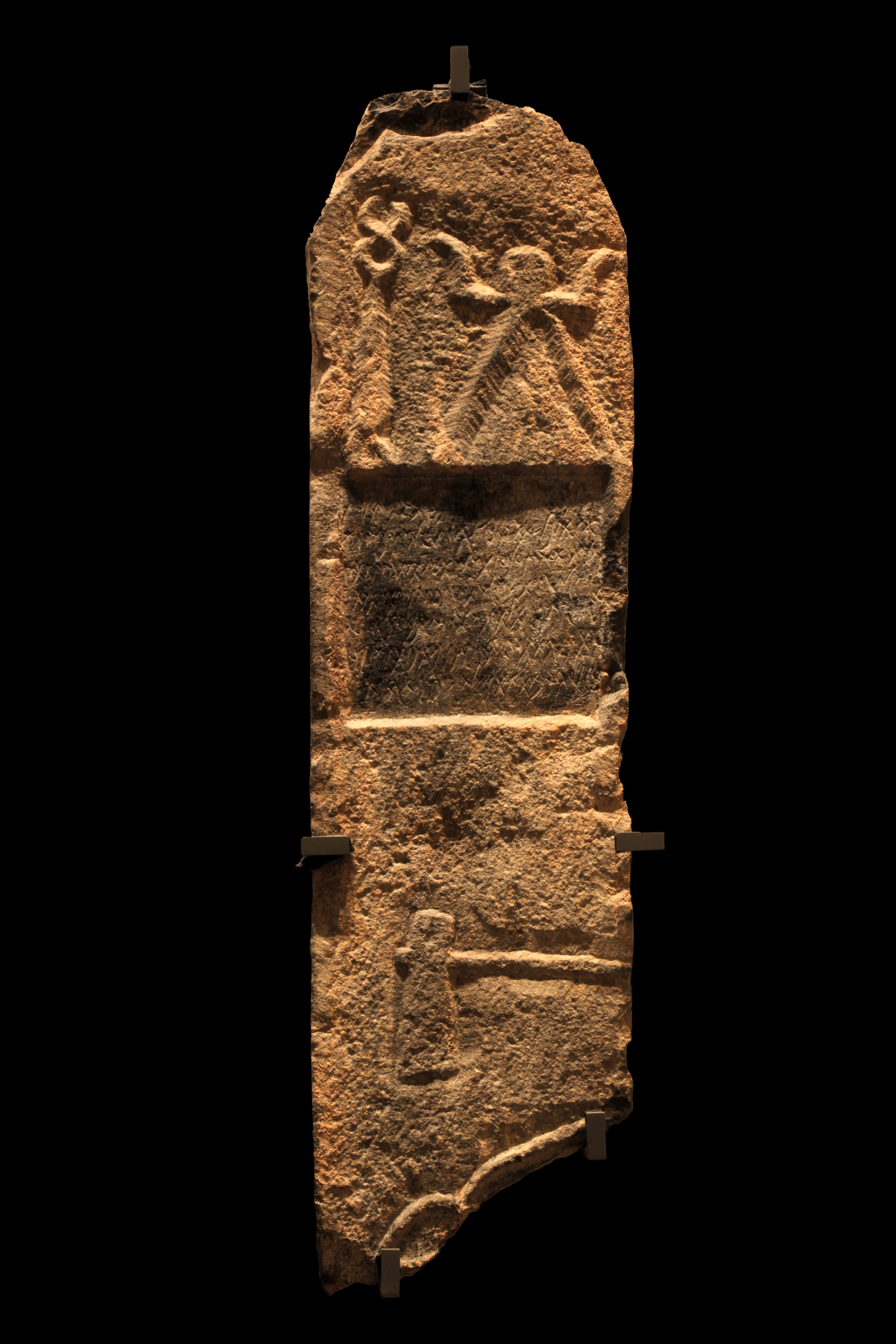

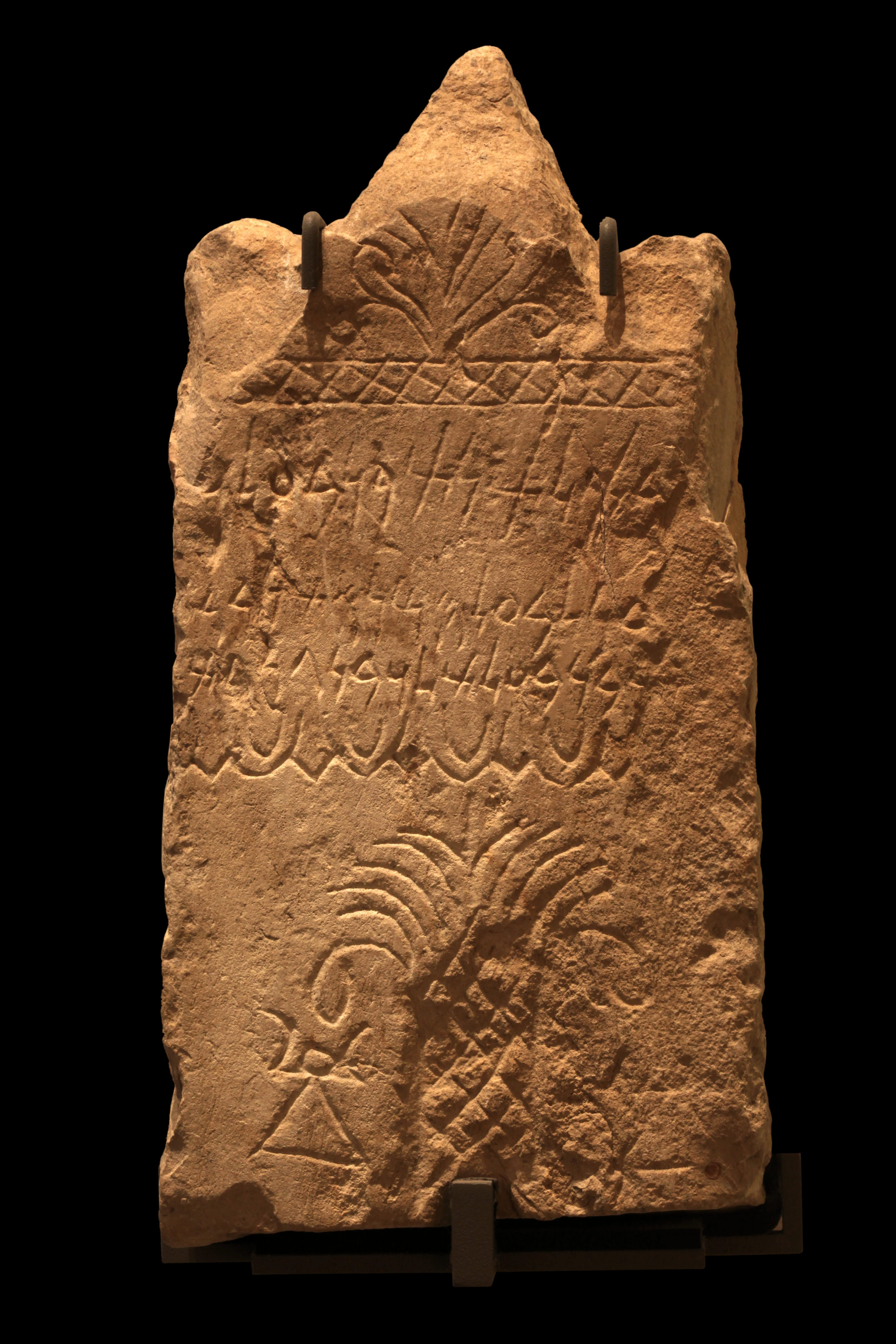

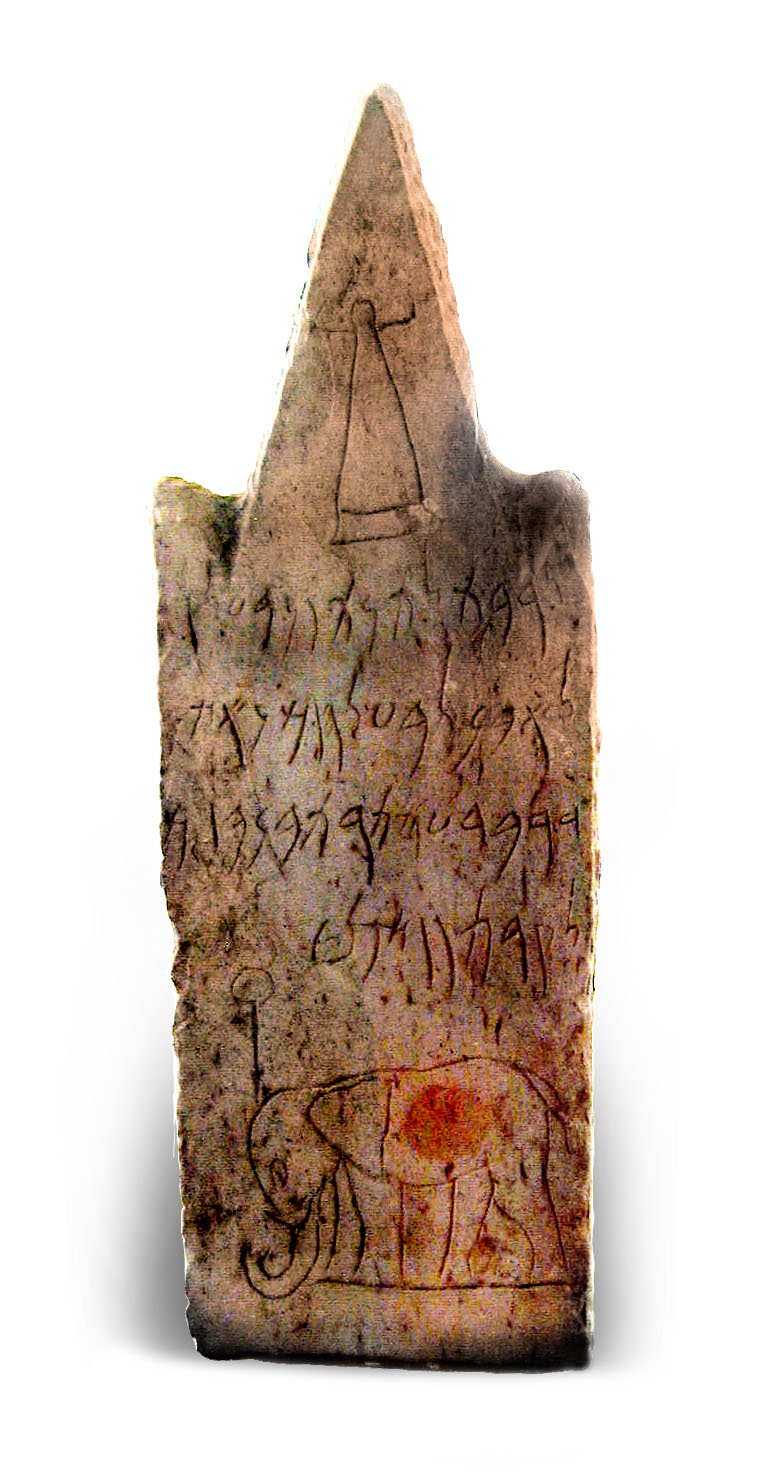

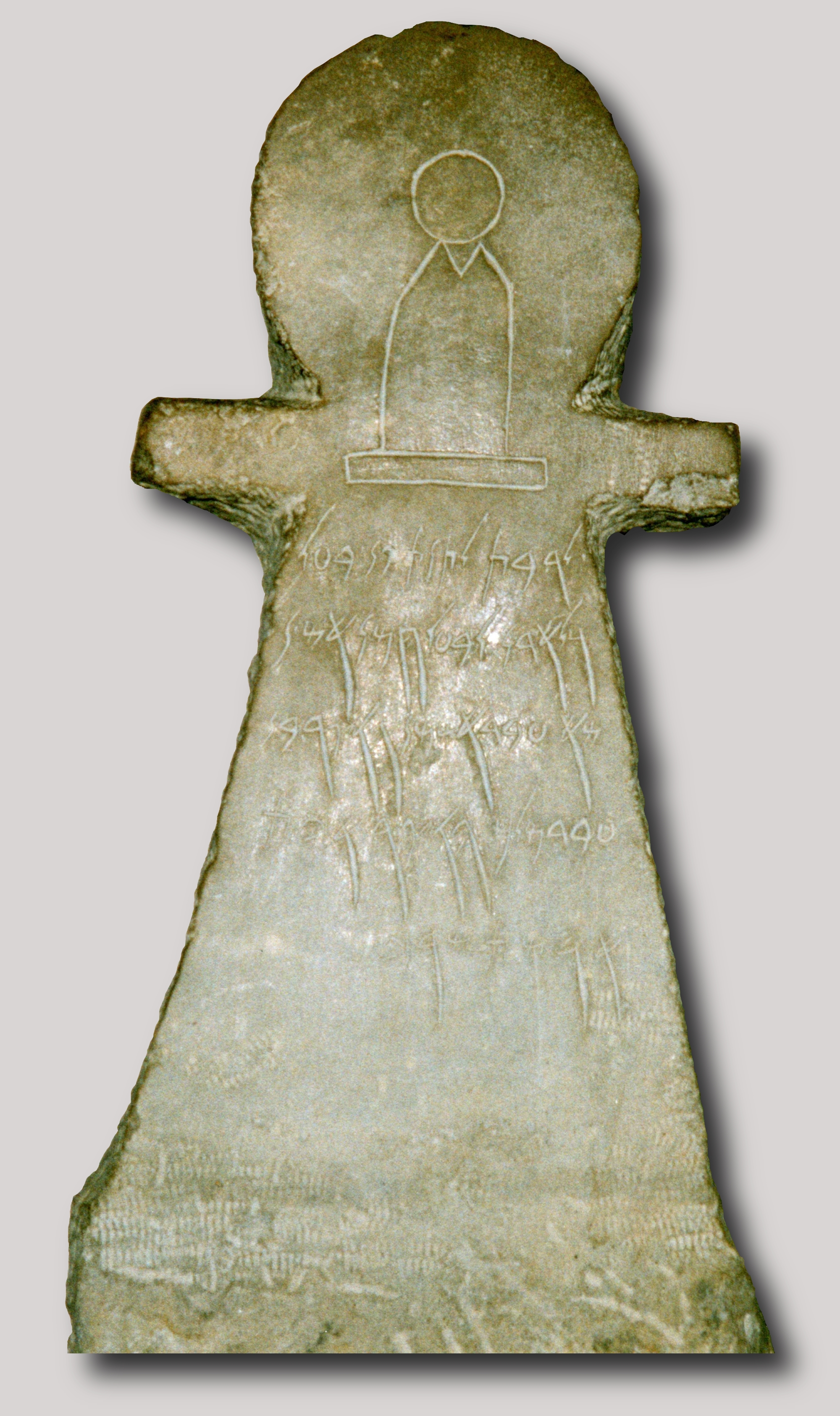
