= Aedicula =

Small shrine in ancient Roman religion

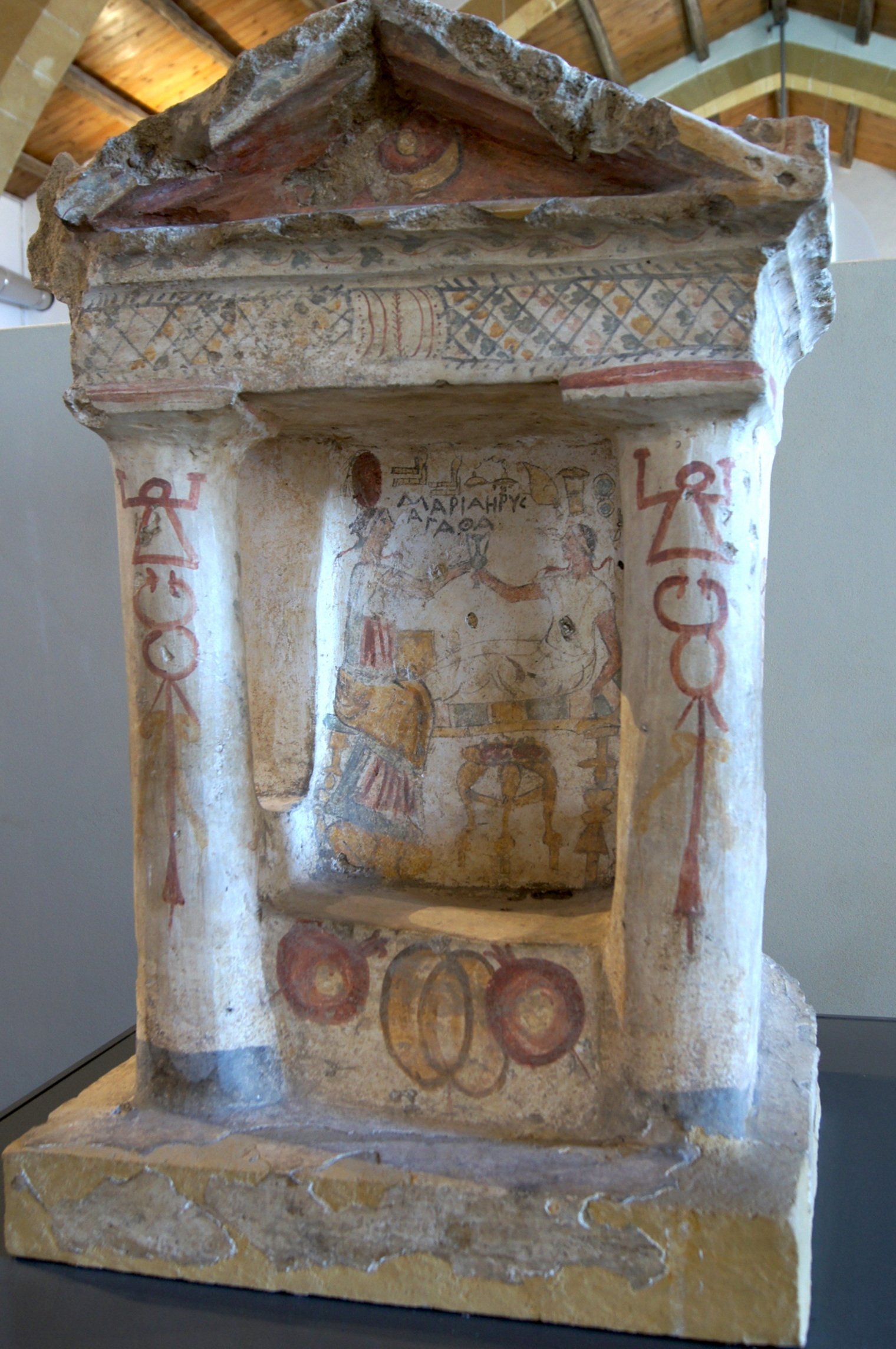
Classical aedicula shrine from Lilybaeum, with sign of Baal Hammon, signs of Tanit and caduceus

In ancient Roman religion an aedicula (pl.: aediculae) (Note: Also: ædicule (pl.: ædiculæ)) is a small shrine, and in classical architecture it refers to a niche covered by a pediment or entablature supported by a pair of columns and typically framing a statue. The early Christian versions sometimes contained funeral urns. Aediculae are also represented in art as a form of ornamentation.

The word aedicula is the diminutive of the Latin aedes, a temple building or dwelling place. The Latin word has been anglicised as aedicule and as edicule. Describing post-antique architecture, especially Renaissance architecture, aedicular forms may be described using the word tabernacle, as in tabernacle window.

== Classical aediculae ==
Many aediculae were household shrines (lararia) that held small altars or statues of the Lares and Di Penates. The Lares were Roman deities protecting the house and the family household gods. The Penates were originally patron gods (really genii) of the storeroom, later becoming household gods guarding the entire house.

Other aediculae were small shrines within larger temples, usually set on a base, surmounted by a pediment and surrounded by columns. In ancient Roman architecture the aedicula has this representative function in the society. They are installed in public buildings like the triumphal arch, city gate, and thermae. The Library of Celsus in Ephesus (ca. 2 AD) is a good example.

From the 4th century Christianization of the Roman Empire onwards such shrines, or the framework enclosing them, are often called by the Biblical term tabernacle, which becomes extended to any elaborated framework for a niche, window or picture.

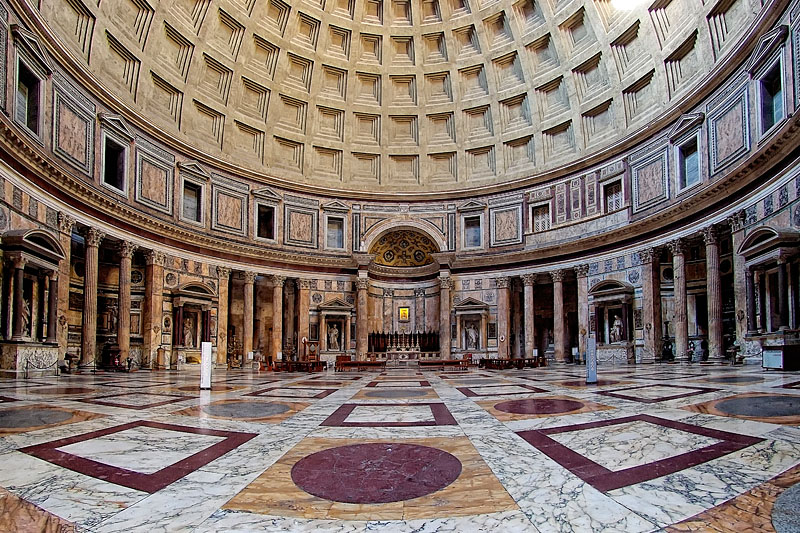
Aediculae in the Pantheon, Rome

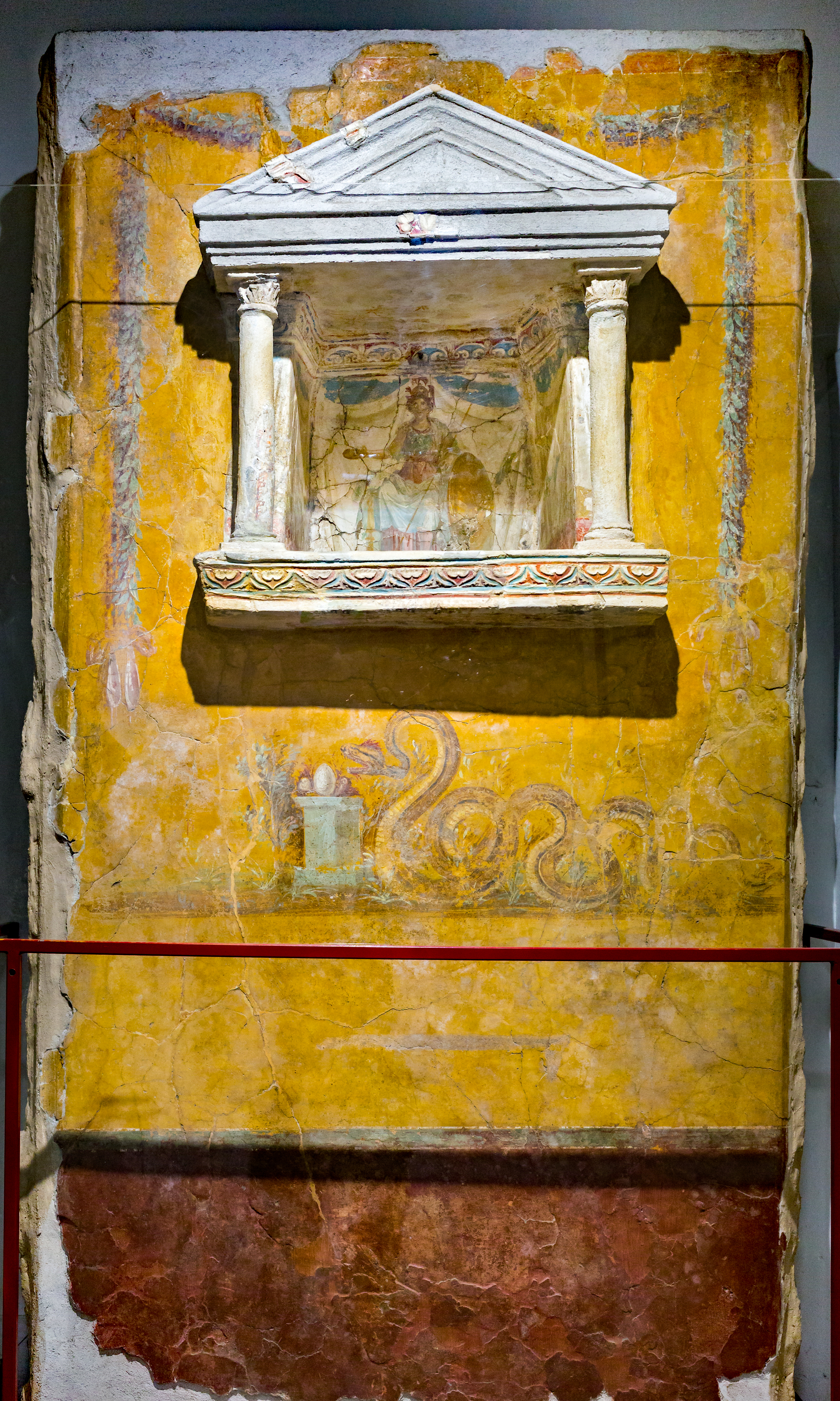
Aedicula containing a painted Athena and Agathodaemon

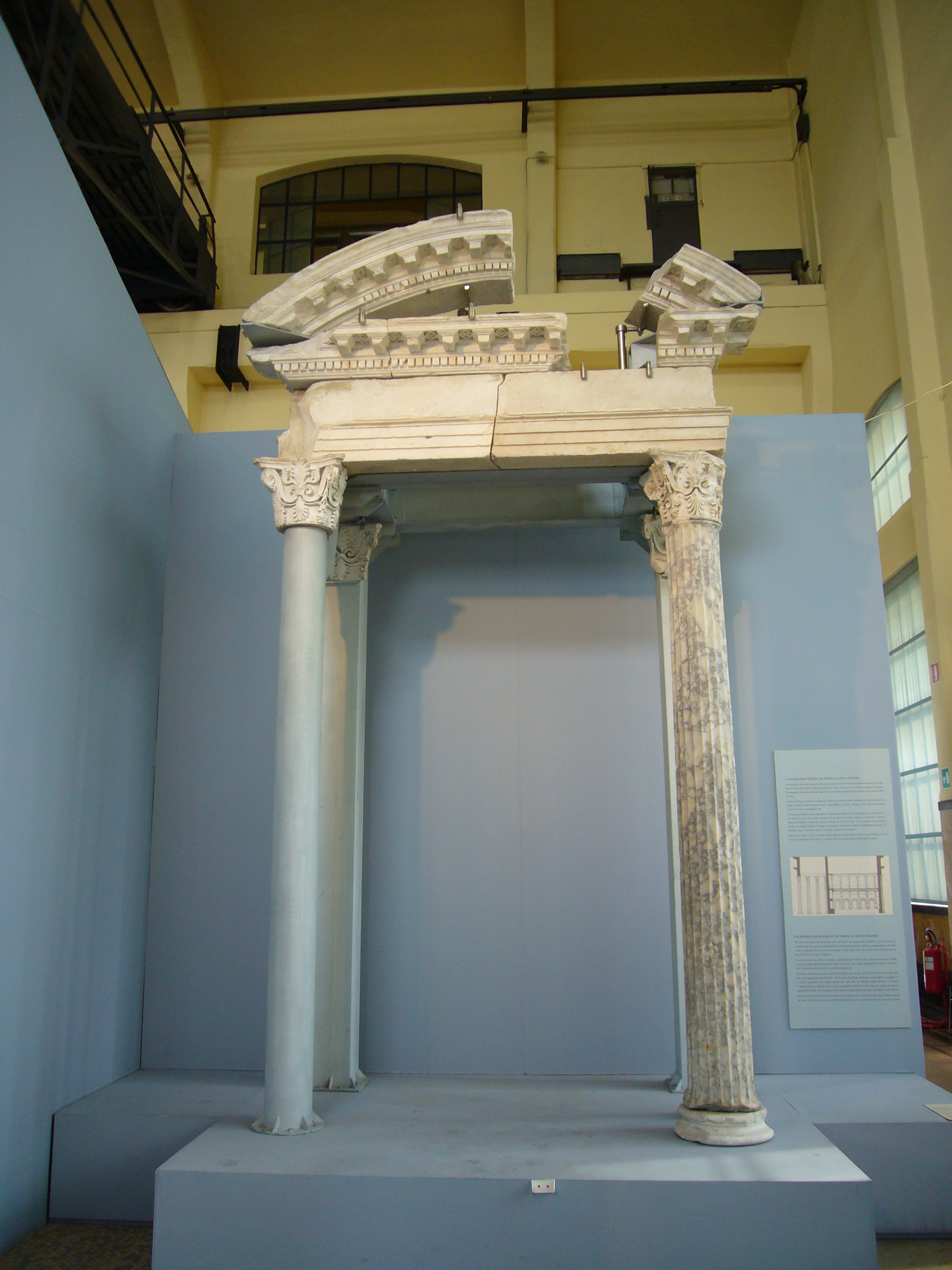
1st century BC interior aedicula from the Temple of Apollo Sosianus, Rome

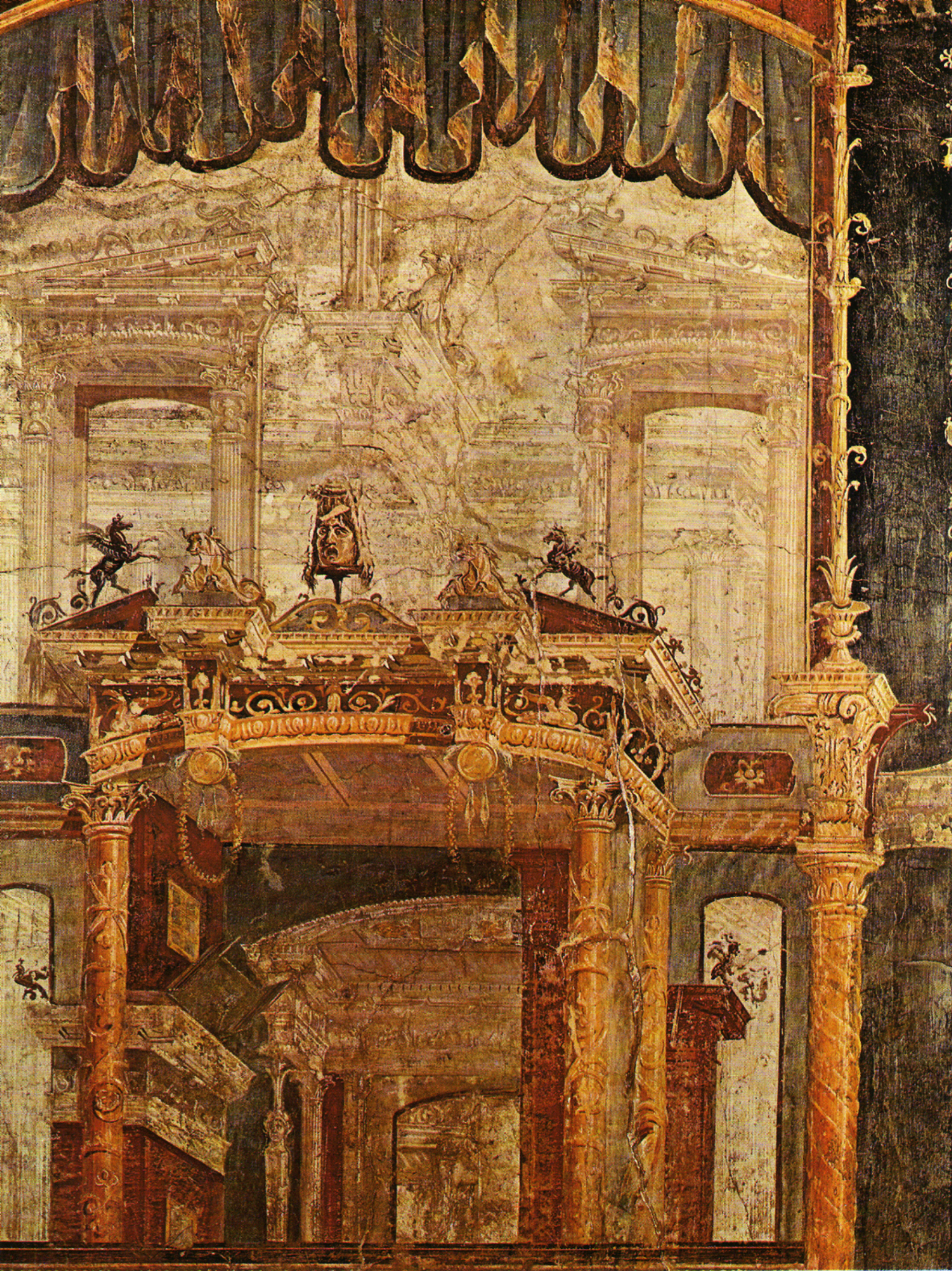
Painted aediculae in a fresco from the palaestra of Herculaneum

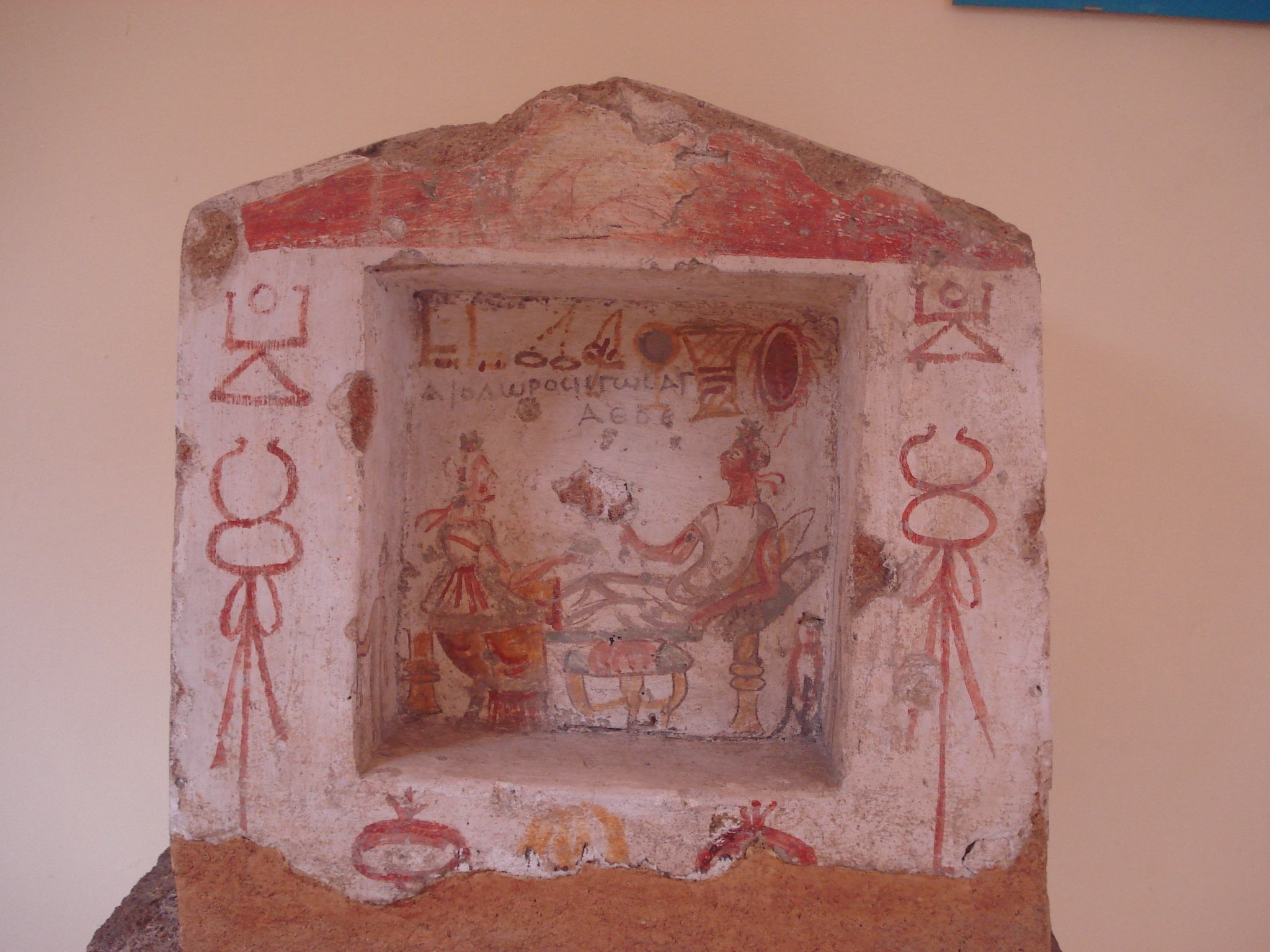
Graeco-Punic funerary aedicula from Marsala, with signs of Tanit and caduceus

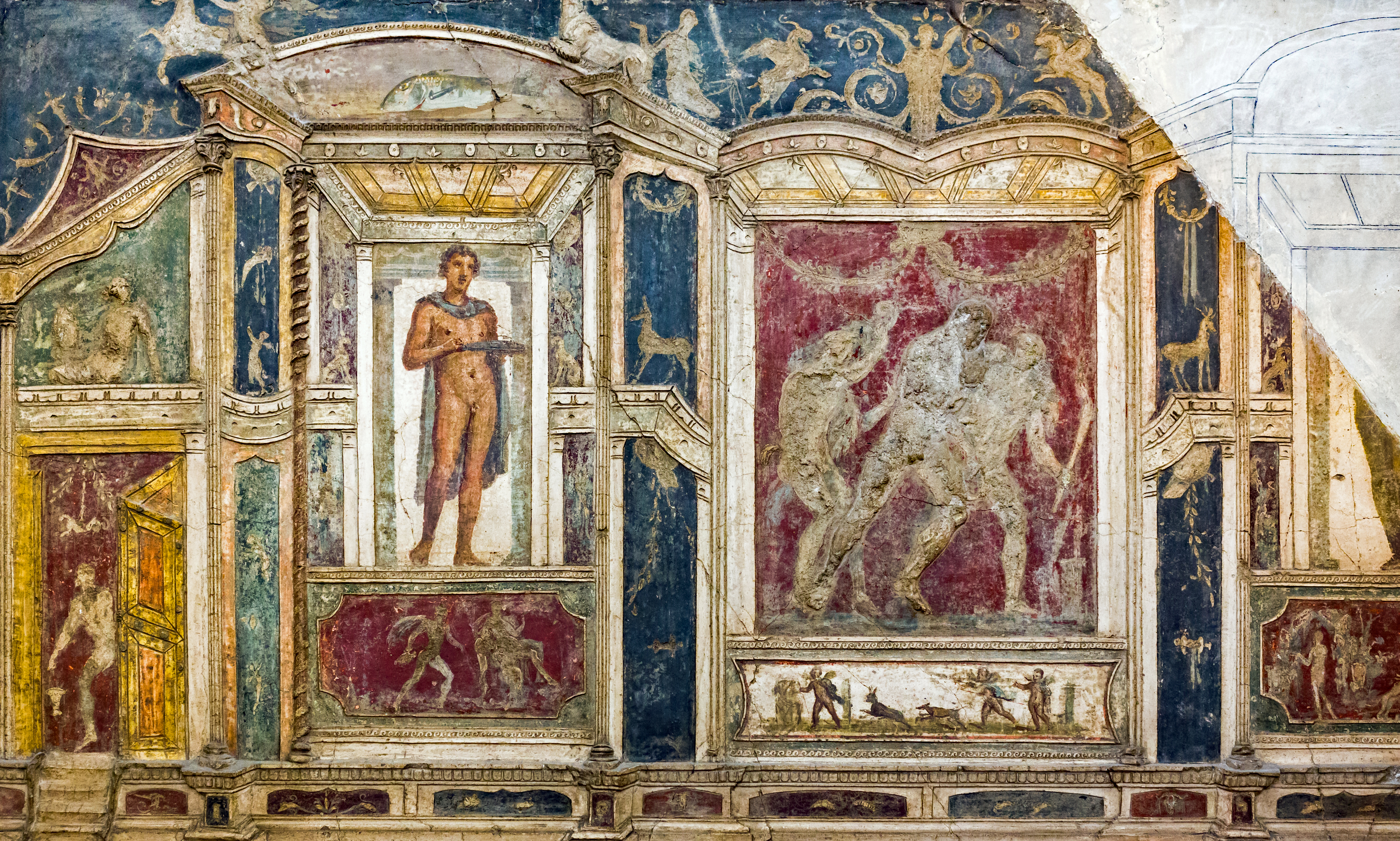
Aediculae and figures painted on stucco from Pompeii

== Gothic aediculae ==
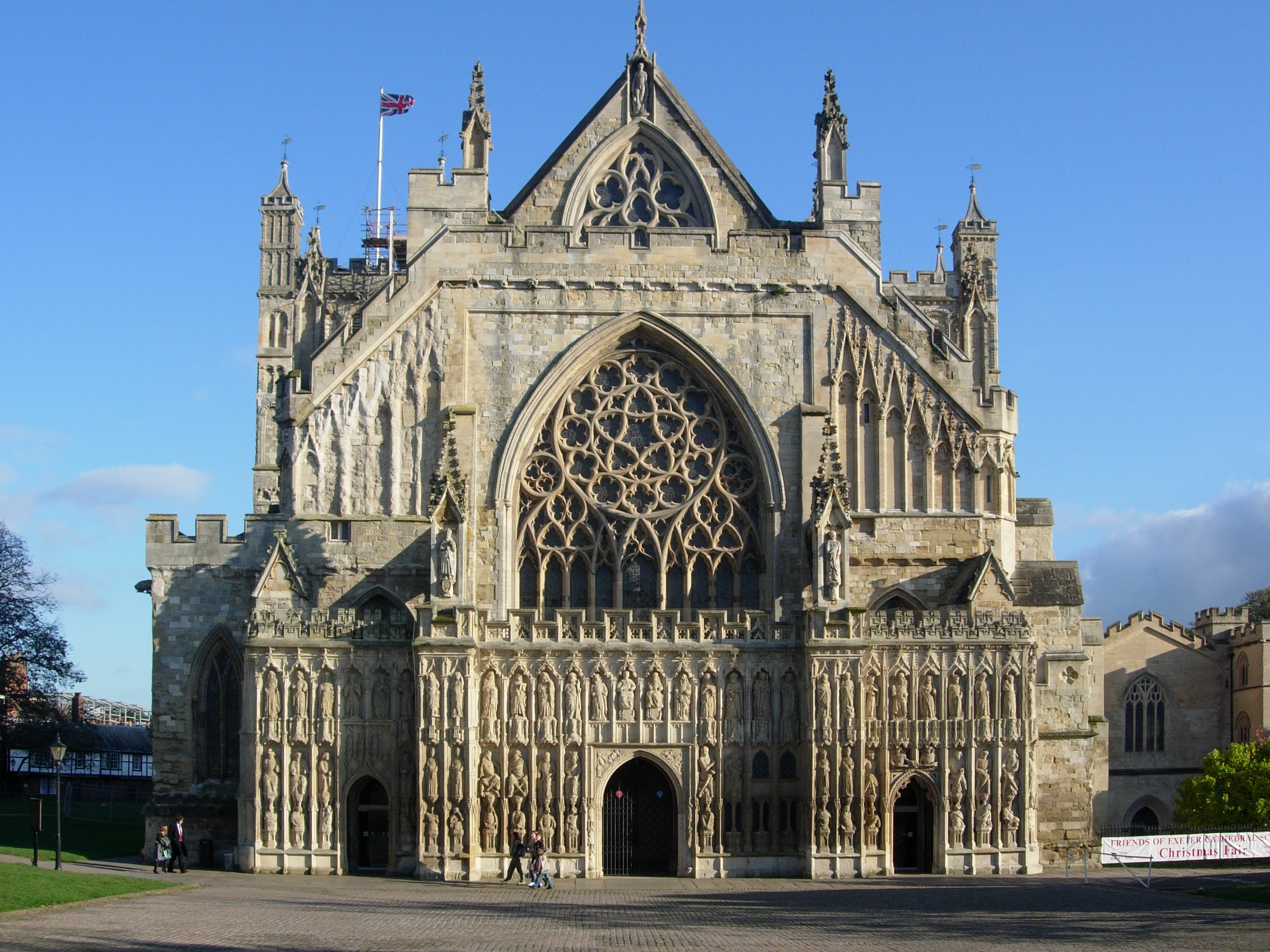
Gothic façade of Exeter Cathedral, with rows of figures in aediculae or tabernacle frames above the door, and two above the crenellations

In Gothic architecture, too, an aedicula or tabernacle is a structural framing device that gives importance to its contents—whether an inscribed plaque, a cult object, a bust, or the like—by assuming the tectonic vocabulary of a little building that sets it apart from the wall against which it is placed. A tabernacle frame on a wall serves similar hieratic functions as a free-standing, three-dimensional architectural baldaquin or a ciborium over an altar.

In Late Gothic settings altarpieces and devotional images were customarily crowned with gables and canopies supported by clustered-column piers, echoing in small the architecture of Gothic churches. Painted aediculae frame figures from sacred history in initial letters of illuminated manuscripts.

== Renaissance aediculae ==
Classicizing architectonic structure and décor all'antica, in the "ancient [Roman] mode", became a fashionable way to frame a painted or bas-relief portrait or to protect an expensive and precious mirror during the High Renaissance. Italian precedents were imitated in France, then in Spain, England, and Germany during the later 16th century.

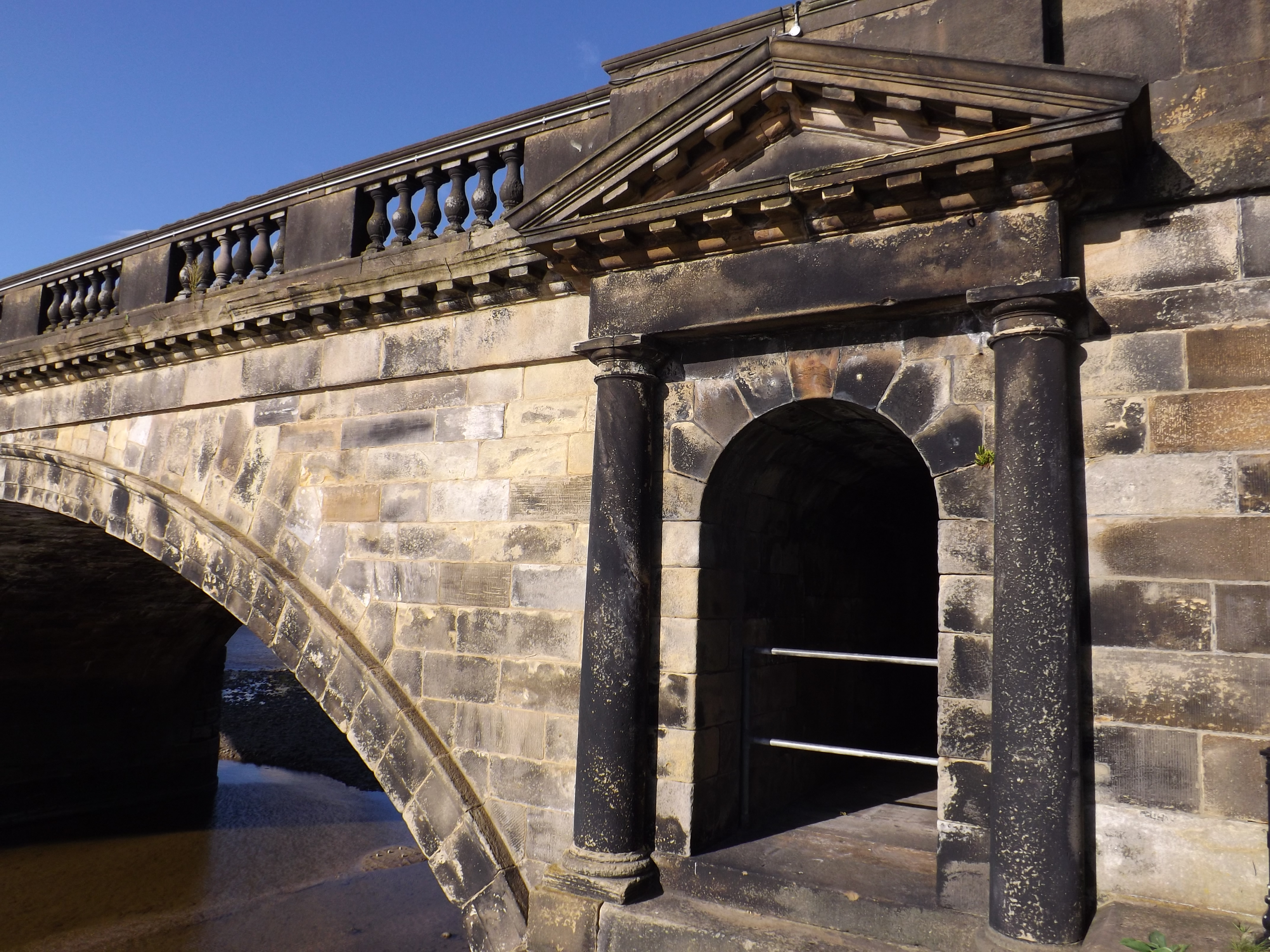
Late 18th-century Doric aedicula on Skerton Bridge, Lancaster, Lancashire

== Post-Renaissance classicism ==
Aedicular door surrounds that are architecturally treated, with pilasters or columns flanking the doorway and an entablature even with a pediment over it, came into use with the 16th century. In the neo-Palladian revival in Britain, architectonic aedicular or tabernacle frames, carved and gilded, are favourite schemes for English Palladian mirror frames of the late 1720s through the 1740s by such designers as William Kent.

Aediculae feature prominently in the arrangement of Saint Peter's tomb with statues by Bernini; a small aedicula directly underneath it (dated ca. 160 AD) was discovered in 1940.

== Other aediculae ==
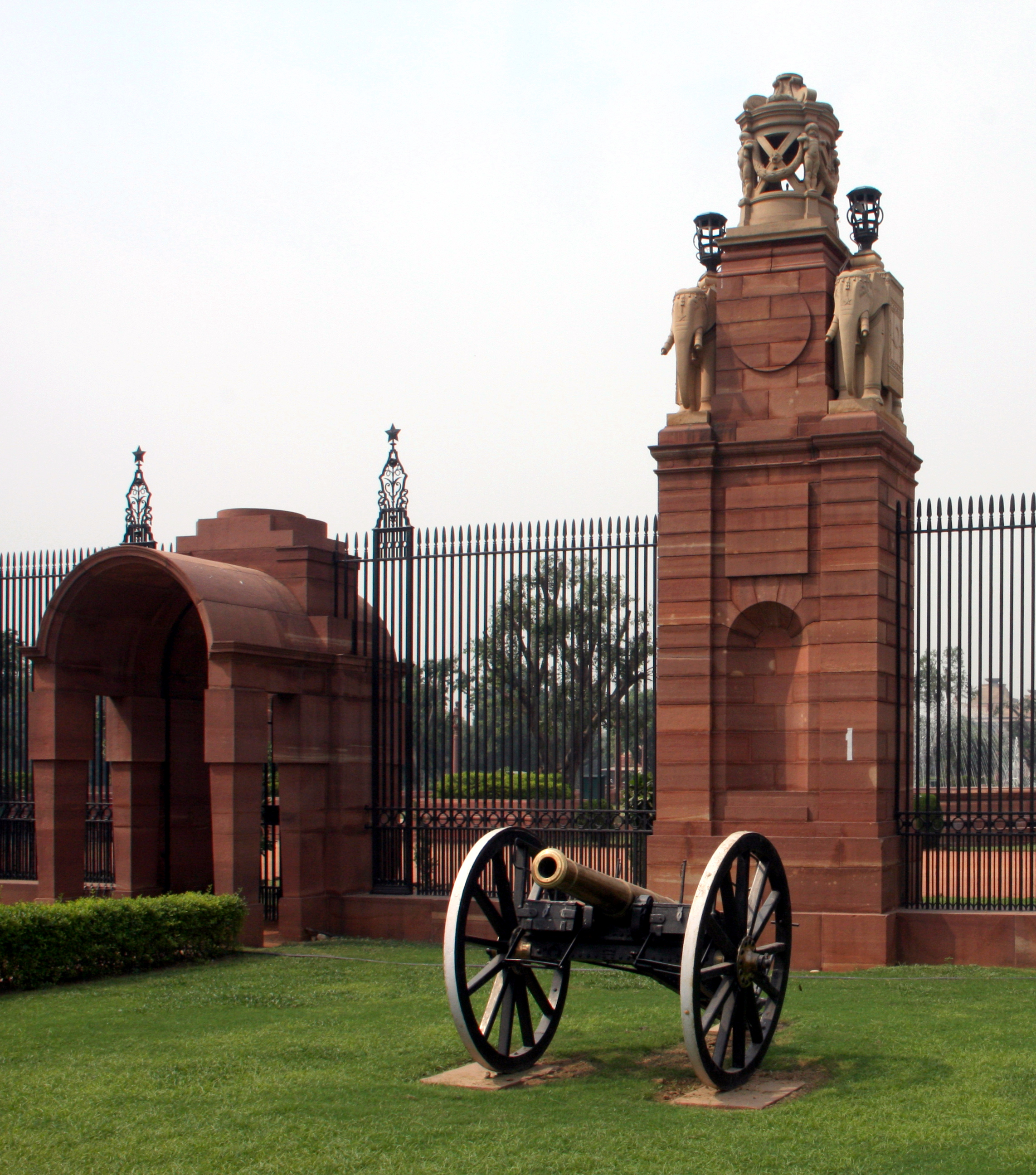
One of Lutyens' sun shade aediculae for cavalry guards around the Viceroy's House, New Delhi

Similar small shrines, called naiskoi, are found in Greek religion, but their use was strictly religious.

Aediculae exist today in Roman cemeteries as a part of funeral architecture.

Presently the most famous aedicula is situated inside the Church of the Holy Sepulchre in city of Jerusalem.

Contemporary American architect Charles Moore (1925–1993) used the concept of aediculae in his work to create spaces within spaces and to evoke the spiritual significance of the home.

Lutyens provided aediculae in the fence around the Viceroy's House in New Delhi to provide shade for mounted cavalry guards.

== See also ==
- Portico
- Church of the Holy Sepulchre: The Aedicule housing the traditional tomb of Jesus
- Similar, but free-standing structures:
  - Ciborium
  - Baldachin
  - Monopteros
  - Gazebo

== Bibliography ==
- Adkins, Lesley & Adkins, Roy A. (1996). Dictionary of Roman Religion. Facts on File, inc. ISBN 0-8160-3005-7.
- Murray, Peter; Murray, Linda (1998). "aedicule". The Oxford Companion to Christian Art and Architecture. Oxford University Press. p. 5. ISBN 978-0-19-860216-3. OCLC 1055176997.
