= Lilybaeum stele =

Phoenician gravestone from Sicily

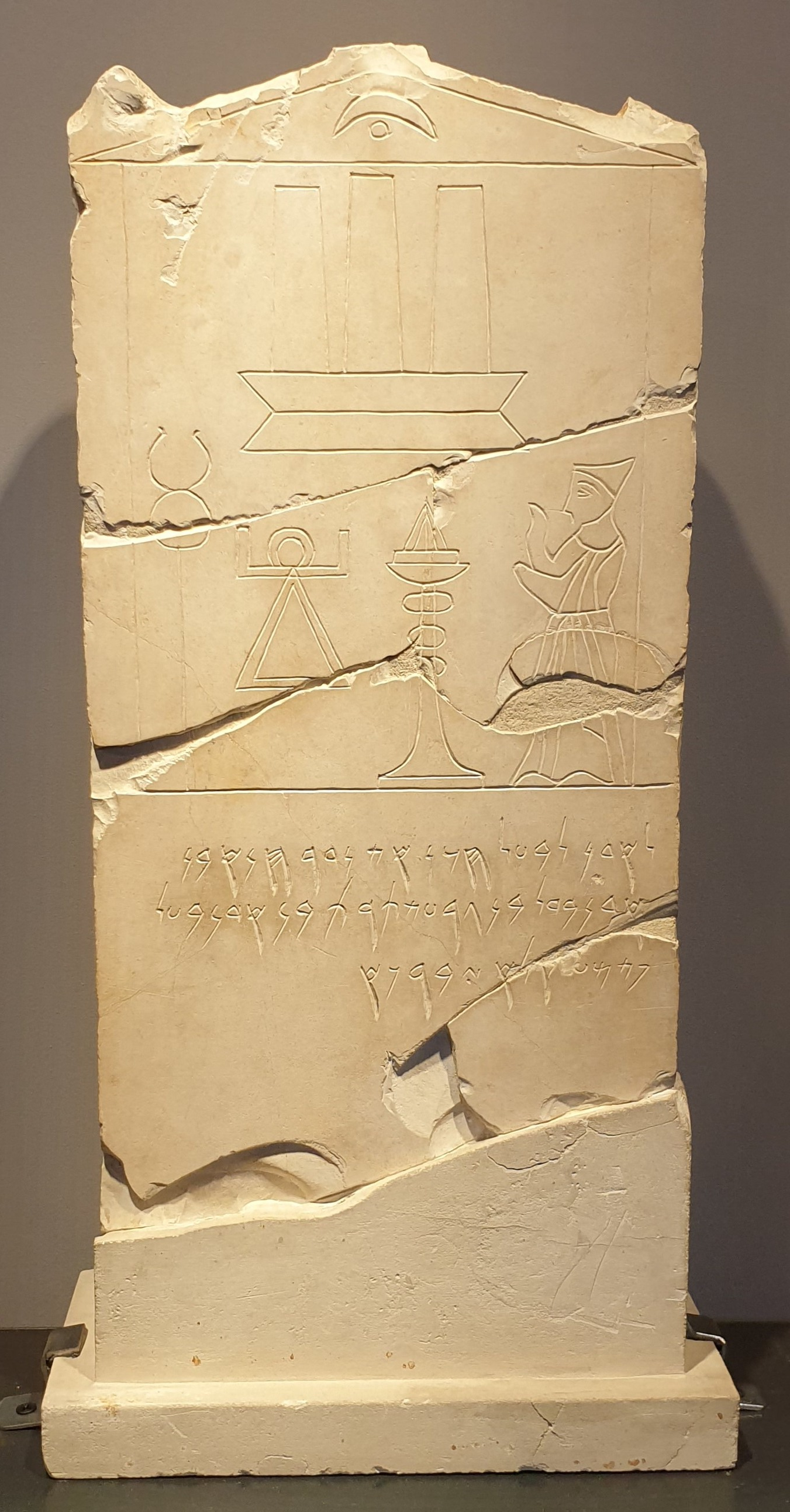
Lilybaeum stele

The Lilybaeum stele is a notable Phoenician gravestone stele found in Sicily and first published in 1882.

The stele was published in the Corpus Inscriptionum Semiticarum, having been supplied to Renan by Count Francesco Hernandez di Carrera. It measures 0.37 x 0.22 m and is made from white calcareous stone.

It was found in Marsala (Roman Lilybaeum), in an area known as il Timpone di S. Antonio. It is currently in the Antonino Salinas Regional Archeological Museum in Palermo.

== Inscription ==
The inscriptions is known as KAI 63 and CIS I 138. It is a standard Punic votive inscription, dedicated to Baal Hammon by Hanno, son of Adonbaal:

lʾdn lbʿl ḥmn ʾš ndr ḥnʾ bn	To the lord - to Baal Hammon, (the stele) which vowed Hanno
ʾdnbʿl bn grʿštrt bn ʾdnbʿl	son of Adonbaal son of Gerastart son of Adonbaal
k šmʿ qlʾ ybrkʾ	for he heard his voice, may he bless him!

== Design ==
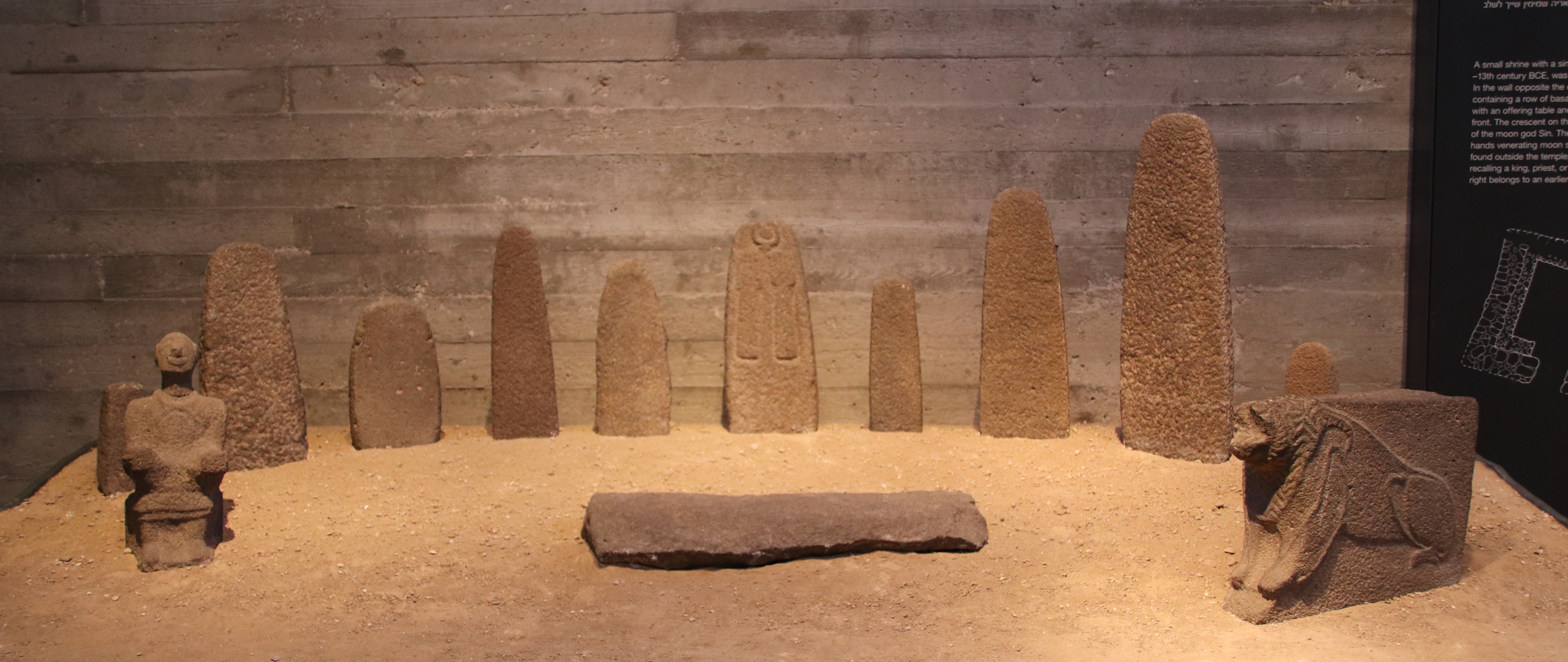
Stelae and statues from Orthostat temple in Hazor. The stelae line (positioned as they were found) are similar to the line on top of Lilybaeum stele, and in the middle there is a stele with a crescent and disc (Baal Hammon symbol) and hand spread towards it (related to Tinnit)

The stele shows some important Phoenician religious symbols. These symbols include symbols of Tanit (Sign of Tanit) and Baal Hammon (a crescent and a disc), Caduceus, an incense burner and a Priest spreads his right hand up (a position related with the cult of Tanit), as well as a depiction of a line of stelae on a stage, similar to a stelae line found in Hazor. On one of the stelae in Hazor, a crescent with a disc and two hand spread ur towards them are engraved.

Its significance was described by Georges Perrot and Charles Chipiez in 1885:

...the chief interest of the monument lies in the bas-relief on its upper part. In the middle of the field stands one of those candelabra of which we have already given examples taken from Carthaginian steles; to the left is the sacred cone, here represented with head and arms as on the coins of certain Asiatic towns; near the cone stands a caduceus, on the right there is a man adoring. He is dressed in a robe falling to the feet and gathered in a band about the waist; a pointed cap is on his head. The whole thing is without value as a work of art, but it gives a good idea of the Phoenician costume, a costume which resembles that still worn in the Levant by those Greek, Syrian, and Armenian merchants who have not yet adopted the costume of Europe.
