= Sign of Tanit =

Anthropomorphic symbol of Punic goddess Tanit

Drawing representing the sign of Tanit found in ancient Stele.

The sign of Tanit or sign of Tinnit is an anthropomorph symbol of the goddess Tanit, present on many archaeological remains concentrated mainly in the western mediterranean in the Carthaginian civilization, Numidia, Sicily and southern Spain.

The symbol has many variants, but the basic form consists of a disc on top of a triangle, separated by a horizontal line, like a schematic image of a person.

The first report about the representations of the sign was in the beginning of the 19th century, on stele unearthed on the site of Carthage. Archaeological excavations have subsequently uncovered representations on other supports, such as mosaics or even on ceramics.

The excavations of tophet of Carthage, Sousse and Motya have highlighted the particularly important diffusion of the symbol in the western Mediterranean Basin, although the lack of discoveries on primitive Phoenician land may only be due to continued occupation of sites, making searches more difficult. Stele containing the sign of Tannit were uncovered in the hundreds in the site of El-Hofra in Cirta (Constantine, Algeria) and are showcased in the Louvre Museum. A single coin with the sign and a legend ΦΑΝΗΒΑΛΟΣ phanebalos, is theorized to be the Greek form of the Phoenician title of the goddess, i.e. 𐤕𐤍𐤕 𐤐𐤍 𐤁𐤏𐤋 tnt pn bʿl, "Tanit the face of Baal (Hammon)", was found in Ashkelon presumably reaching the site through a carthagenian trade route to the eastern mediterranean.

Modern scholars associate the symbol with the goddess Tanit, partner of Ba'al Hammon and the most important goddess in the Punic religion. This identification is widely, but not universally, accepted. The motif may have had an apotropaic purpose, intended to offer protection from the evil eye.

The symbol is used in some contexts in modern Tunisia. For example, it has appeared on the Tanit d'or, the grand prize of the biennial Carthage Film Festival, since its establishment in 1966.

== Gallery ==
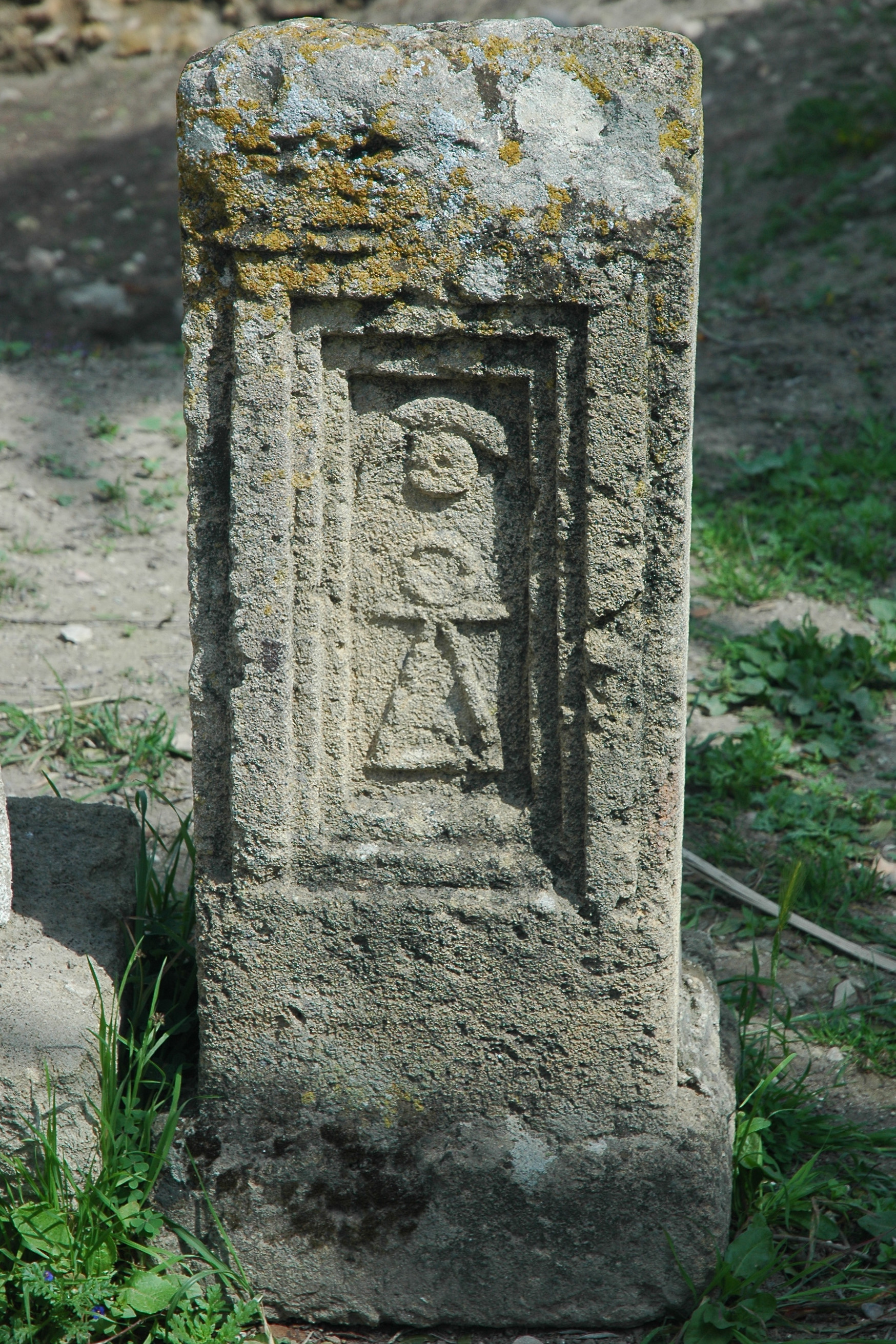
Stele of the necropolis of Carthage

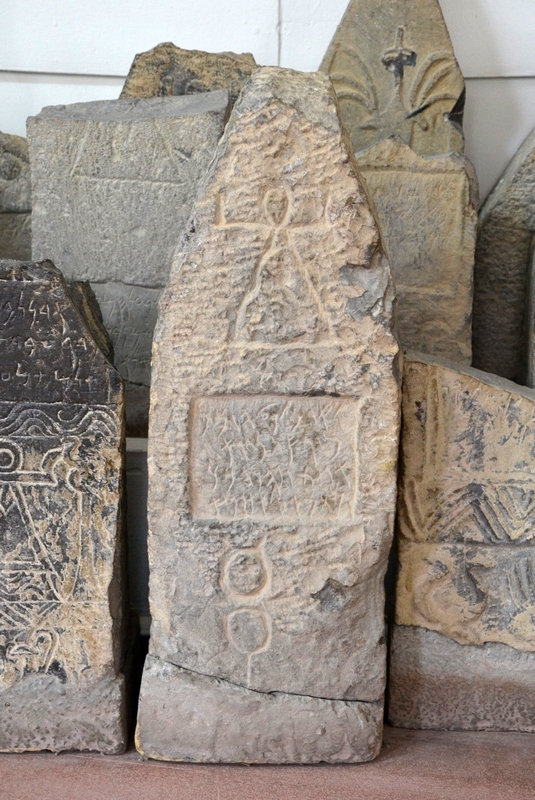
Hundreds of Funerary Stele with the sign of Tannit were found in Cirta, Algeria are displayed in Louvre Museum.

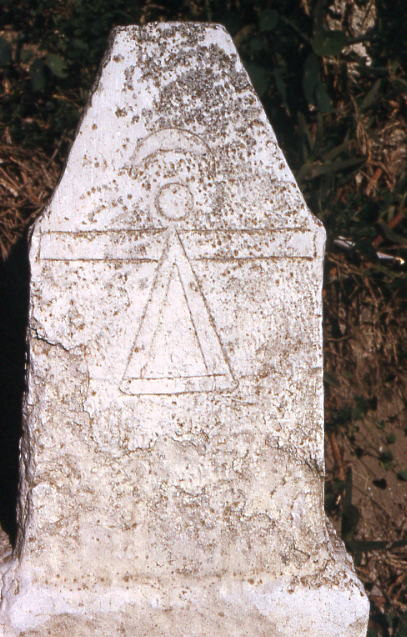
Stele of the necropolis of Carthage

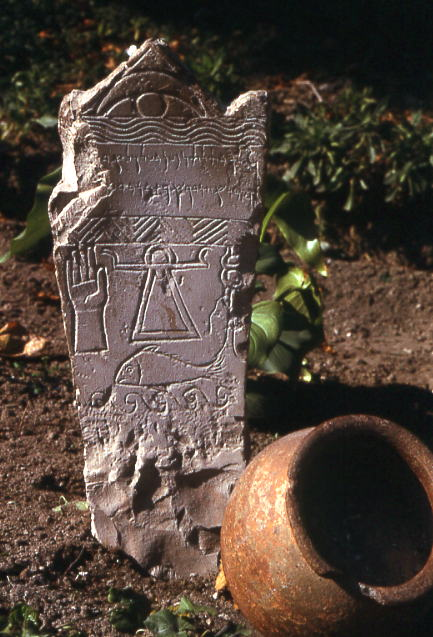
Stele of the necropolis of Carthage

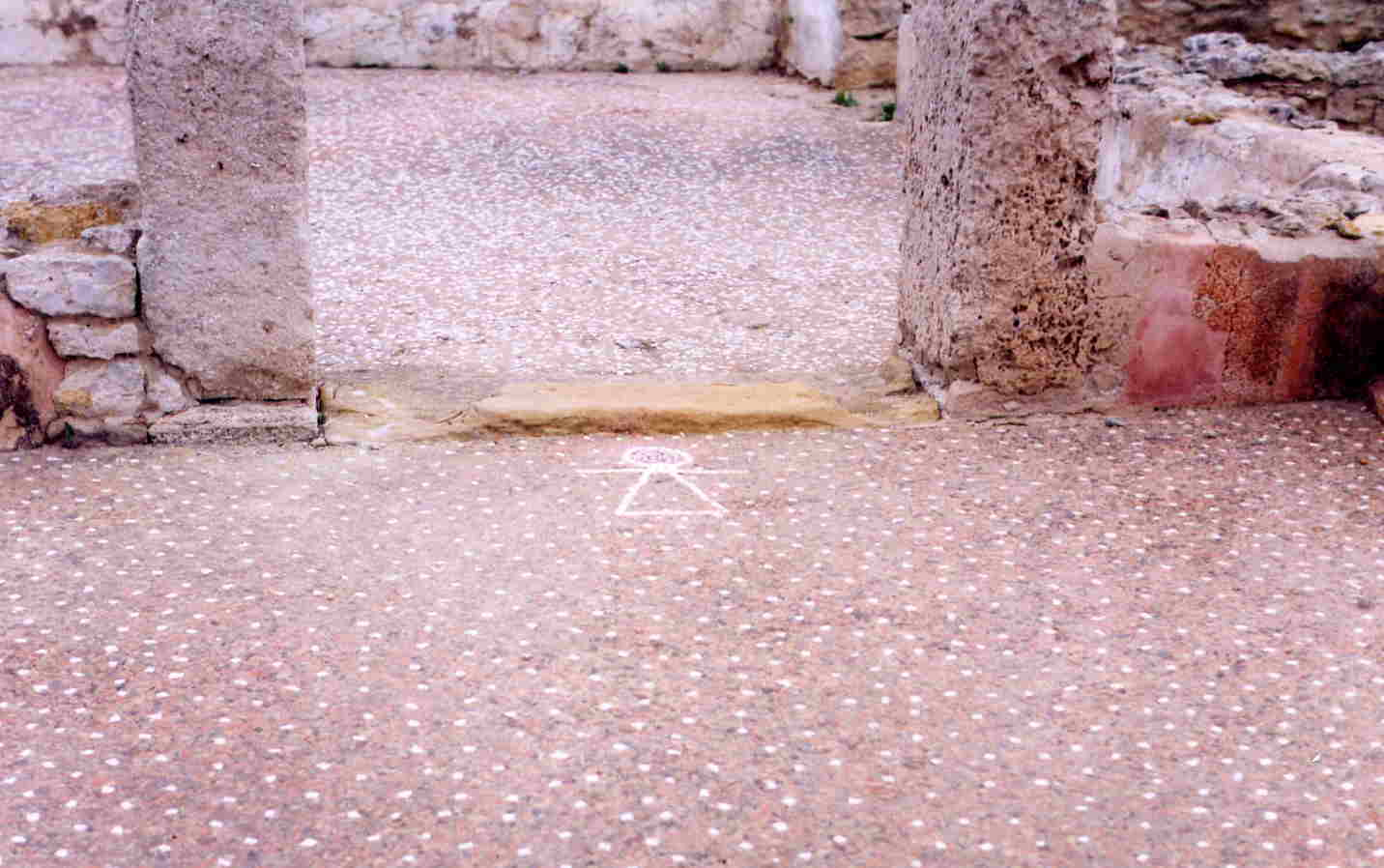
Representation of Tanit's sign at Kerkouane

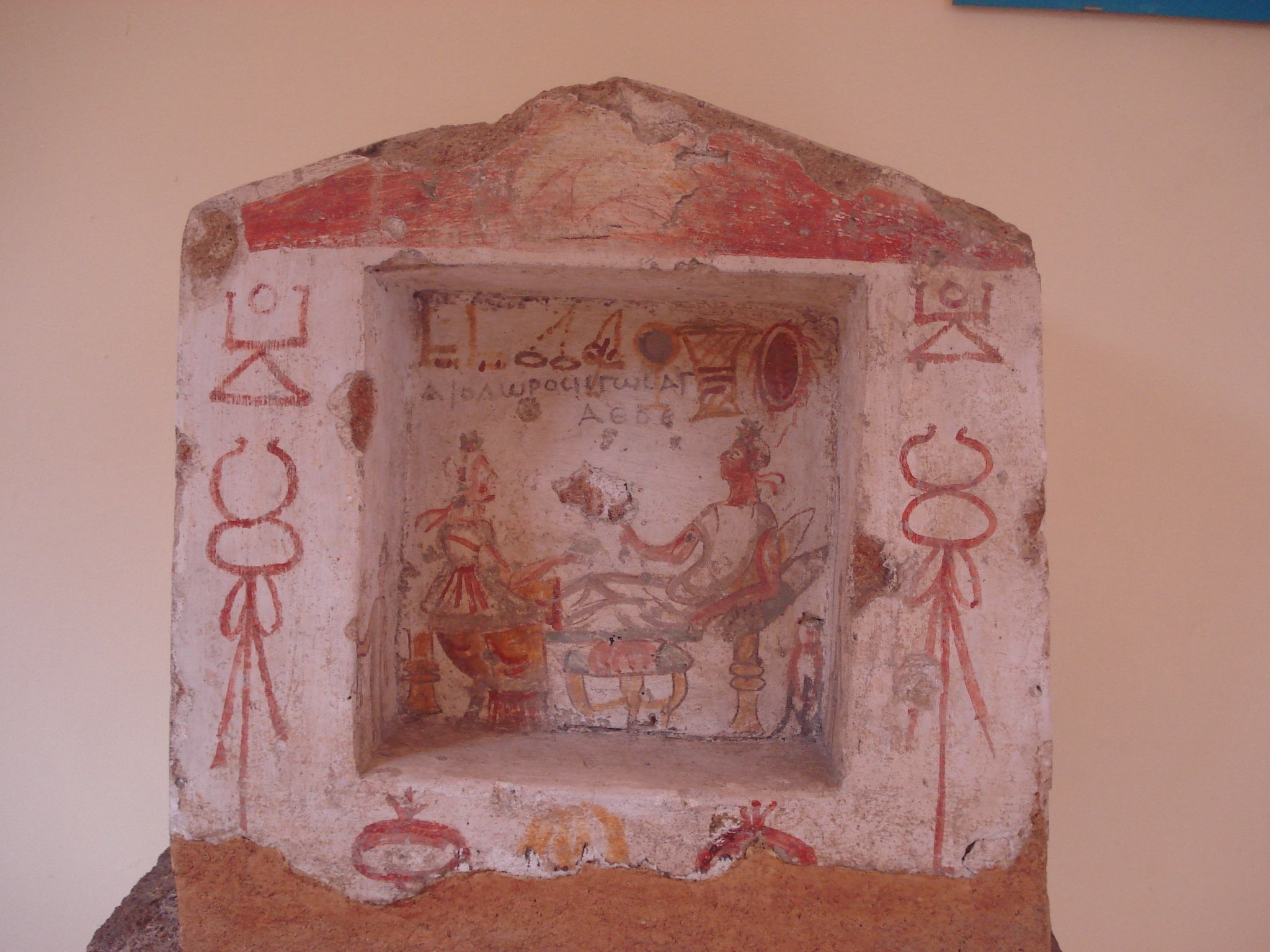
Graeco-Punic funerary aedicule of Marsala, with painted Tanit's sign

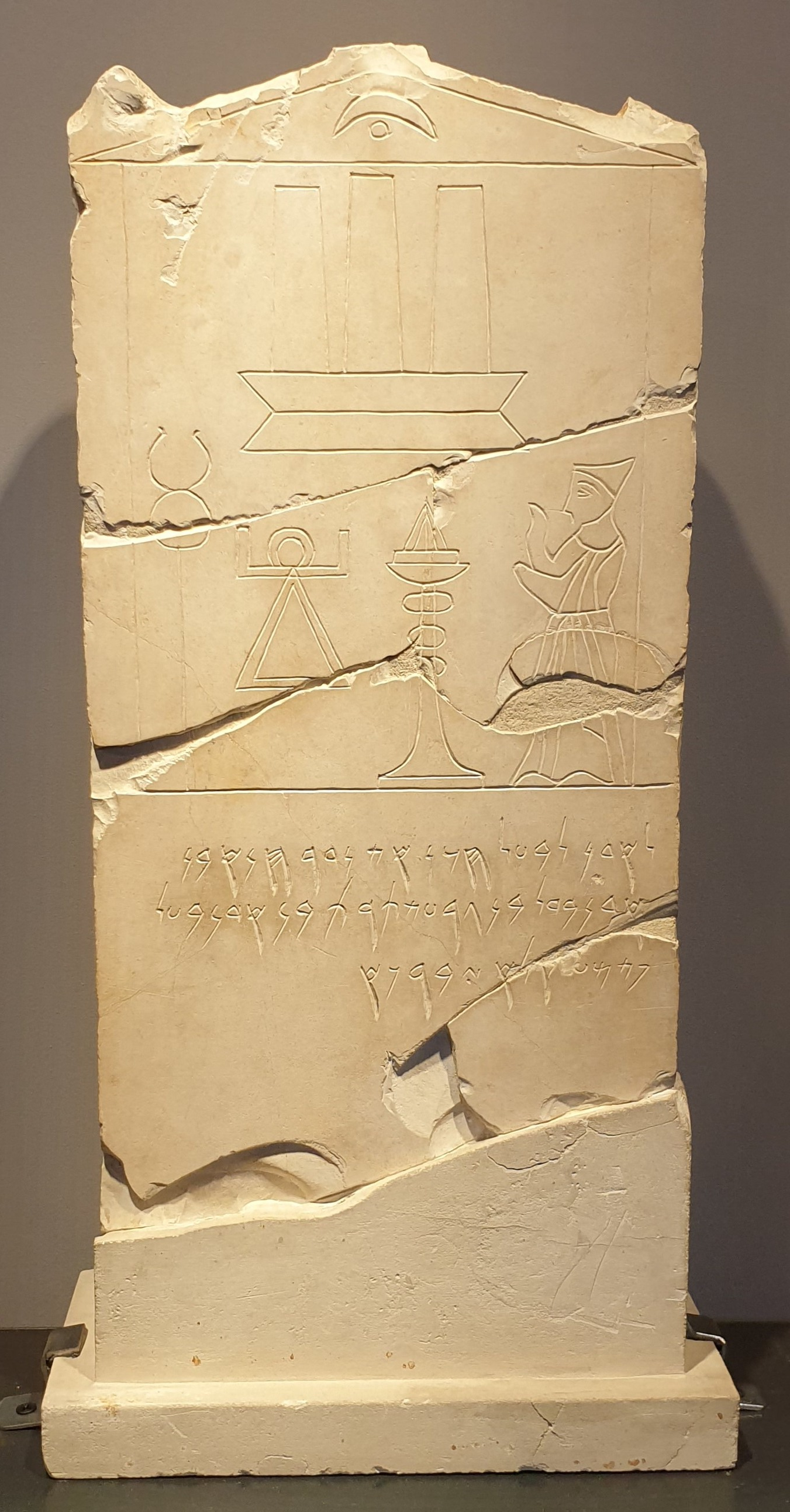
Tanit's sign on Lilybaeum stele

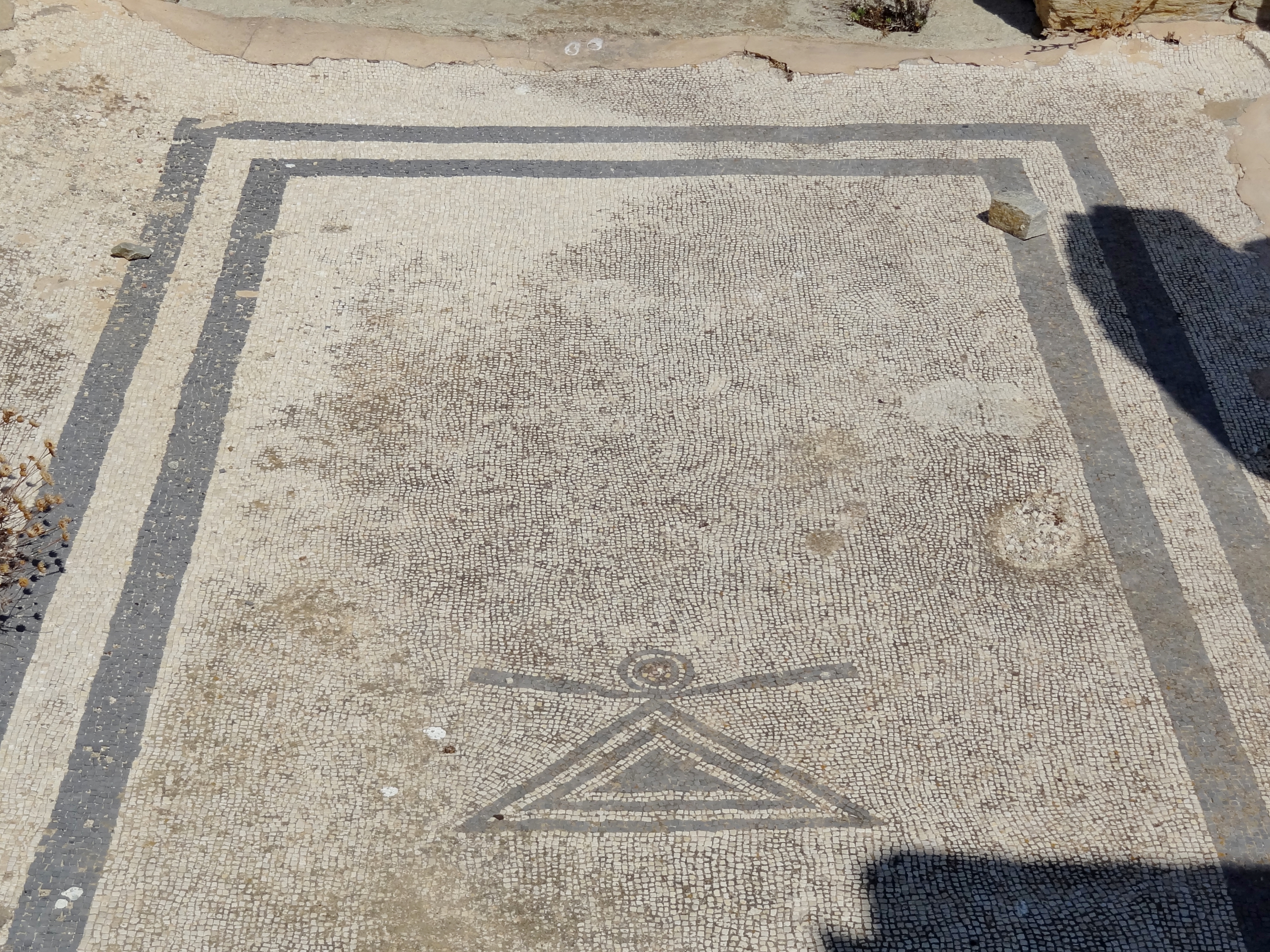
Tanit's sign in a Delian mosaic in the House of the Dolphins

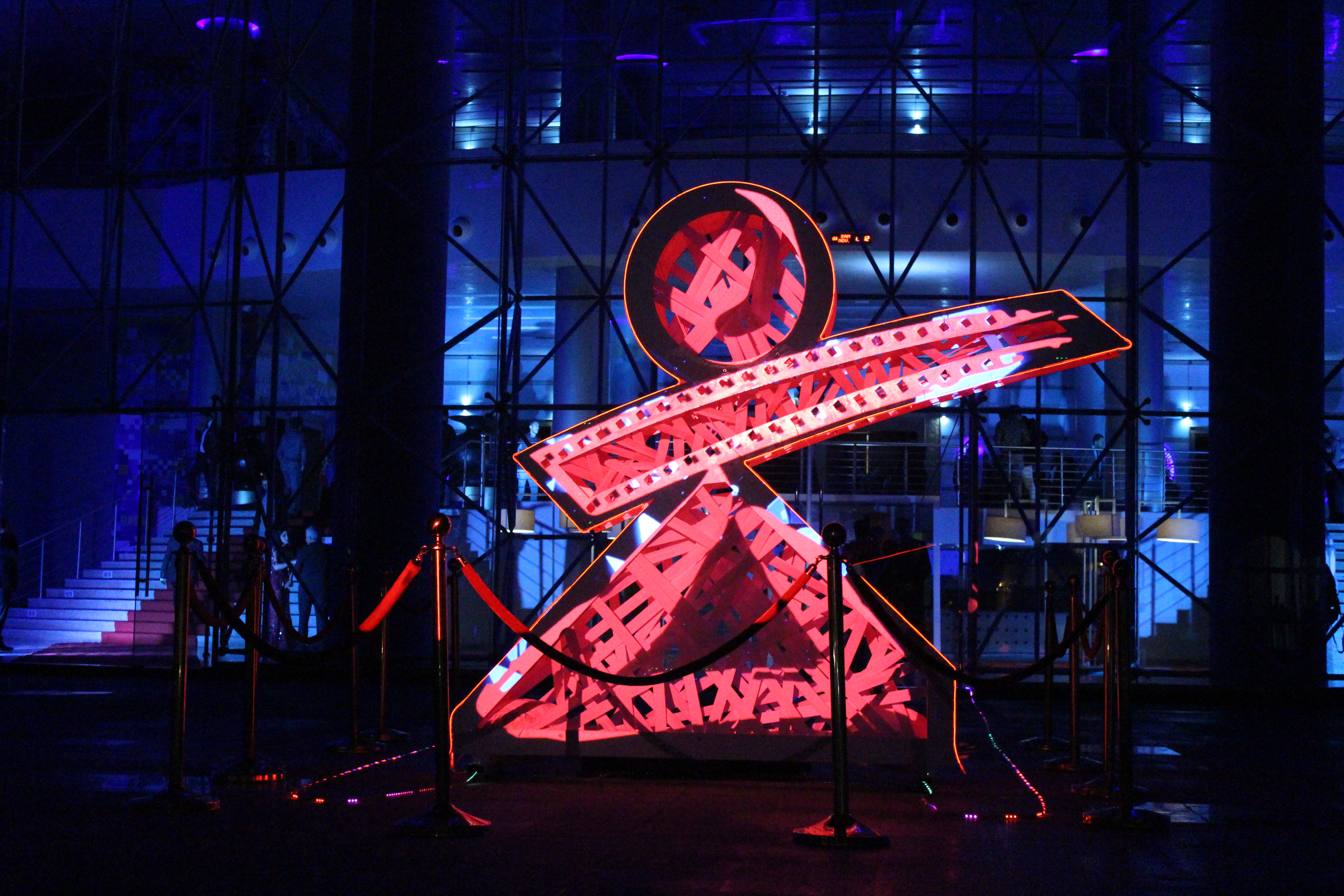
A Modern Tanit's sign at the opening ceremony of the Carthage Film Festival 2018

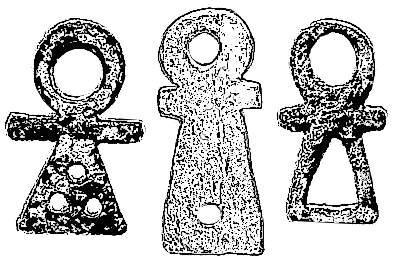
Sign of Tanit pendants from Ashkelon

== See also ==
- Ankh
- Poppy Goddess
