= Puerto Hurraco massacre =

Mass murder that occurred in Spain

- Location: 38.640962°N 5.537965°W; Puerto Hurraco, Benquerencia de la Serena; Spain
- Date: 26 August 1990 c. 21:30 – 22:00 (UTC+1)
- Target: Cabanillas family, other townspeople
- Attack type: Mass murder
- Weapon: Two 12-gauge Franchi 48AL semi-automatic shotguns
- Deaths: 9
- Injuries: 12
- Perpetrators: Antonio Izquierdo; Emilio Izquierdo

The Puerto Hurraco Massacre was a mass murder that occurred on 26 August 1990 in Puerto Hurraco, a village in Benquerencia de la Serena municipality, Province of Badajoz, (Extremadura, Spain). The perpetrators were brothers Emilio and Antonio Izquierdo, who murdered 9 people in the street, some belonging to the Cabanillas family, which had a long-time enmity with the Izquierdos, and caused serious injuries to 12 others. The perpetrators fled but were apprehended the next morning, and were later sentenced each to 342 years in prison.

== Background ==
At the time of the massacre, Puerto Hurraco had 130 inhabitants, which increased to 200 in the summer with the return of people who had migrated to work outside, mostly in the Basque Country.

According to some sources, the rivalry between the Cabanillas (locally nicknamed Amadeos) and the Izquierdo families (Patas Pelás or Patapelás, "Bare Legs") went back to the 19th century, when the Cabanillas arrived in Puerto Hurraco from Cuba, and a stabbing had already taken place over an unapproved relationship between an Izquierdo male and a Cabanillas female in 1929. Manuel and Isabel Izquierdo moved to Puerto Hurraco from Benquerencia de la Serena with their six children: sons Jerónimo, Emilio, and Antonio, and daughters Emilia, Luciana, and Ángela. Only Emilia married and moved out of the parental home while the others stayed with them. The youngest son, Antonio, lost one eye after being attacked by a chicken when he was a child.

This generation had the first quarrel in 1963, when Amadeo Cabanillas drove a plough on land owned by Manuel Izquierdo. According to a widespread story, Luciana Izquierdo wanted to marry Amadeo Cabanillas, but he rejected her, which caused her great suffering. Luciana's eldest brother, Jerónimo Izquierdo, took this as an insult to the family and fatally stabbed Amadeo Cabanillas on January 22, 1967, a few days after the rejection. However, a neighbor dismissed the story as a baseless rumor, claiming that the enmity of the families was rooted solely on land disputes. In either case, Jerónimo was arrested and served 14 years in prison for the murder, after which he moved to Barcelona.

Isabel Izquierdo died in a house fire at their residence in Carrera street on October 18, 1984. She was invalid and bedridden. Although investigators determined that the fire was accidental, the Izquierdo siblings blamed Antonio Cabanillas, brother of the murdered Amadeo, and accused the Cabanillas of watching the house burn while doing nothing about it. Civil Guard Vicente Salguero, one of the officers that arrested Antonio Izquierdo later, cast suspicion on the Izquierdo siblings instead, pointing out that they saved a refrigerator from the fire but not their mother.

In 1986, Jerónimo Izquierdo returned to Puerto Hurraco and attacked Antonio Cabanillas with a knife, but he survived. The attacker was interned in a psychiatric hospital on August 8, 1986, and died there nine days later.

While in Puerto Hurraco, Luciana and Ángela were known to insult Civil Guards from the balconies of their home, but Emilio and Antonio were not involved in any disorder. After the fire, the siblings moved to Monterrubio de la Serena, where they "spiraled into madness". Luciana and Ángela would kneel before the local Civil Guard barracks, clamoring for justice; they also asked neighbors to turn off their electric domestic appliances, fearing that they had bombs inside. An employee of a Monterrubio pub said that the sisters were "totally paranoid", depressive, fanatically religious, and mentally unwell. They claimed to hear noise constantly, which they attributed to the electricity meter, and cut all electricity to their house.

== Shooting ==
According to their sisters, on Sunday, 26 August 1990, Emilio and Antonio Izquierdo left their house in Monterrubio de la Serena after saying that they were going to hunt turtle doves. Dressed as hunters and armed with 12 gauge shotguns, they put as much ammunition in their clothes as they could carry and hid in an alley of Puerto Hurraco. Emilio, the elder brother, was the leader of the shooters. He later told psychiatrists that "vengeance had to be in summer because, though I'm a good shooter, the winter cold numbs my hands and I feared failing," and that "before leaving [for Puerto Hurraco] we took a 3 mg Lexatin so that our pulse wouldn't tremble when we pulled the trigger." Around 21:30 the brothers walked into Carrera, the main street in Puerto Hurraco, where many neighbors sat outside a bar and their own homes to get fresh air in the evening. According to Emilio Izquierdo, the intended targets were Antonio Cabanillas or his daughters, "so they know what it is to lose a loved one and leave them a memory they will never forget".

The first victims were Encarnación and Antonia Cabanillas, two of the three daughters of Antonio Cabanillas, who were 13 and 14 years old, respectively. Manuel Cabanillas, an émigré who was in Puerto Hurraco for a family vacation and was readying a car to visit the local festivities in nearby Esparragosa de la Serena, approached the shooters and yelled: "Emilio, what the fuck are you doing?" Without reply, Emilio Izquierdo pointed the gun to Manuel Cabanillas, who turned around and was shot in the back. From this point, the brothers would "shoot any bulk", "aiming for the heart and head," because they feared the whole village would attack them. The brothers shot Manuel's wife Felicidad next, who suffered minor injuries, and their 24-year-old son Antonio Cabanillas (not the father of the slain girls), who was left paraplegic. A 60-year-old woman, Araceli Murillo, was murdered when she tried to help the girls. After checking that Encarnación Cabanillas was dead, Manuel Cabanillas's other son, Jesús Fulgencio Cabanillas, helped his father and Antonia Cabanillas in his Ford Fiesta and drove them to a hospital in Don Benito, where they died half an hour later.

Manuel Benítez, his sister-in-law Antonia Murillo, and brother Reinaldo Benítez were shot when they tried to flee Puerto Hurraco in a car, injuring the former and killing the other two. The Izquierdo brothers then waited at the main entry to the village to shoot incoming vehicles. Here they killed José Penco, who had driven two wounded girls to Castuera and was returning to Puerto Hurraco to help more victims. A Civil Guard 4L arrived next, and the siblings shot officers Antonio Fernández and Manuel Calero, who were injured. One of the officers jumped out of the car and fired his weapon. When the attackers heard returning fire, they fled.

In total, the brothers shot twenty-one people in fifteen minutes, resulting in nine deaths and twelve injuries. Some fatal victims were finished while laying on the ground. Critical victims were moved to Infanta Cristina Hospital in Badajoz, including six-year-old Guillermo Ojeda, who was shot in the head and left in coma until he woke up on September 1. Ojeda was left hemiplegic. His father, Andrés Ojeda, and grandmother, Isabel Carrillo, died in the same hospital.

Guillermo Fernández Vara performed the autopsies of some victims and collaborated in the psychiatric evaluation of the shooters.

== Manhunt ==
Following the attack on the 4L, the entryways to the village were closed off by the Civil Guard. A group of officers reached the Cabanillas family home to inform of the massacre and the deaths of their daughters. Antonio Cabanillas, who was in bed, overheard the officers talking to his wife, and walked out with his own shotgun and two cartridges, saying that it was war because the Izquierdos wanted it and that it was going to end. He was then convinced to let go of the weapon.

The Izquierdo brothers fled through an alley to an orange grove, twenty to twenty-five meters from the end of the village, where they separated. Antonio stayed in the grove during the night, while Emilio reached the opposite side of the village. In the dark, a patrol of four Civil Guard officers walked near Antonio Izquierdo without noticing him, as they were only helped by a small lantern. Eventually, the manhunt reached eighty to two hundred Civil Guard officers, dogs, off-road vehicles, and one helicopter. Antonio Izquierdo was found at 8:00 in the morning by officer Blas Molina, still armed with his shotgun. Molina took cover behind some rocks and fired two shots in the air, then yelled Izquierdo to throw the gun or be shot. Izquierdo surrendered and was taken back to the street. When addressed, Izquierdo told officers to kill him if they wished to, and later asked Molina to shoot him twice. As Izquierdo was introduced in a vehicle, the mayor of Puerto Hurraco, Braulio Nogales, attempted to stab him with a knife. Molina put himself between both men and no one was injured.

Emilio Izquierdo was found by the helicopter one hour later, hiding in a bramble patch. Neither brother was aggressive when arrested. The two were taken to the courthouse in Castuera, where a crowd gathered calling them "murderers" and "to hang them". Neither showed remorse after their detention. Emilio Izquierdo later declared: "Let the town suffer now like I have been suffering all this time", and Antonio claimed that they planned to continue the shooting: "If they had not caught us we would have returned to the village to shoot them during the burial of the dead."

Emilio and Antonio Izquierdo were imprisoned pending trial in Córdoba, where they shared a cell and were considered model, non-troubling prisoners. Emilio considered the pair innocent and different from other prisoners because in his opinion, vengeance was a duty, not a crime. Antonio tried to apologize, but would always obey his brother without question.

== The sisters travel to Madrid ==
At the same time as the massacre occurred, Luciana and Ángela Izquierdo traveled by train to Madrid, where they wished to be received in the Palace of Moncloa by president Felipe González and tell him that their family was victim of a plot by the Cabanillas family, the town of Puerto Hurraco, and the Civil Guard. To this end, the four siblings joined the ruling Spanish Socialist Workers' Party before the massacre. On August 27, the sisters appeared in Moncloa, fully dressed in black, where they showed the four party IDs and requested a meeting with the president. However, they were not let in for lacking an invitation.

On August 30, they were summoned to testify at the Castuera courthouse. An Antena 3 TV crew led by journalist Agustín Gómez interviewed them aboard the return train to Badajoz. The sisters said that "We have an upset stomach because of all that happened. Anyone calling us guilty of inducing our brothers to do such thing, should say it before us, if they dare." They also said that the neighbors blamed them because "they have no fear of God". Among those gathered outside the courthouse when they arrived was Antonio Cabanillas, who was found to have a knife and was disarmed by law enforcement.

The prosecutor accused Ángela and Luciana Izquierdo of instigating the crimes, but the provincial court dismissed all charges against them in 1992. Instead, they were recluded in a psychiatric hospital in Merida.

== Trial ==
Ángela and Luciana Izquierdo were escorted to attend the trial of their brothers in Badajoz in 1994, among strong security measures. Due to their kinship, they were allowed to not testify against their brothers. The sisters showed their support by kissing them.

At the trial, Emilio Izquierdo claimed to not remember the events due to memory gaps and that he had no intention of killing people when they went "hunting", but also called the village a "bad place" and blamed its population for the death of his mother in the fire, which he claimed was covered up by the locals. Antonio Izquierdo claimed to have fired into the air only, with the intention of warning people, but witnesses identified him as the one who shot most people and the killer of Antonia and Encarnación Cabanillas. The defense tried to have the charges dismissed due to mental alienation of the accused. The tribunal admitted that the accused suffered from a degree of distortion of reality, but rejected the claim of insanity, declaring that "Their intelligence is within the norm, a fact that is corroborated because they were capable of managing a flock of about a thousand sheep, had leased farms and [now] possess, [even] with the crisis that is going on in the countryside, a 10 million pesetas bank book"; "the accused outlined a 'plan to exterminate' the largest possible number of inhabitants of the village of Puerto Hurraco"; "they chose the alley and the night because they knew the habits of their neighbors and they knew that 'at that time and from that place they could kill more people'". The tribunal also claimed that the accused exhibited "a cultural primitivism and an affective impoverishment that determines contempt for human life", "fed their own phobias and obsessions due to an abnormal social isolation and the fact that they lived together in a closed group".

Found guilty, each brother was sentenced to 342 years in prison, and to pay 300 million pesetas in compensation to the victims. Additionally, they would not benefit from early excarceration when they reached the age of 70.

== Aftermath ==
Emilia Izquierdo, who had continued to live in Puerto Hurraco and ceased contact with her siblings, left the village with her husband and daughters when the massacre happened and never returned. Like other Puerto Hurraco residents, her daughter blamed her aunts for instigating the massacre and called for the punishment of her relatives.

At first, Luciana and Ángela shared a room in the hospital, and Emilio and Antonio a cell in prison. But both pairs were separated because they would not stop talking about the Cabanillas and the murders.

Luciana Izquierdo died on 13 January 2005, in the mental hospital of Merida at the age of 77. In November of the same year, Ángela died in the same hospital at the age of 62. Their brothers were not allowed to leave prison to attend either funeral. Emilio Izquierdo died of cardiac related causes on 13 December 2006, while interned in Badajoz prison. This time Antonio attended Emilio's funeral, where he said: "Brother, you go to Heaven at 74 but you go with the satisfaction that your mother's death has been avenged."

The last surviving of the four, Antonio Izquierdo, hanged himself with his bed sheets on 25 April 2010, aged 74, in the nurse unit of Badajoz prison, where he was interned because of health issues. He had been scheduled for release on the same day, before his release was prevented due to the application of the 2006 Parot doctrine, which delayed his release for another five years. He was also denied semi-liberty regime on account of his behavior in prison.

In 2015, neighbors of Puerto Hurraco requested that the former home of the Izquierdo family in Carrera street, which was never repaired or reoccupied after the fire, was declared a ruin and demolished.

== In pop culture ==
The case inspired the song Veraneo en Puerto Hurraco by the band Def Con Dos. Italian skapunk band Persiana Jones released an album named Puerto Hurraco in 1999, but the title is a tribute to an unrelated bar in Barcelona.

The massacre was loosely dramatized in the 2004 film The 7th Day, directed by Carlos Saura and written by Ray Loriga, with the last names of the families changed from Izquierdo to Fuentes and Cabanillas to Jiménez. It stars Juan Diego as Antonio, José Luis Gómez as Emilio, and Victoria Abril as Luciana.

== See also ==
- Running amok
- Spree killer
