= Fred Friedrich =

German painter

- Born: Alfred Erwin Günter Friedrich; January 24, 1943 (age 83); Kreuzberg, Berlin

Alfred Erwin Günter Friedrich (born 25 January 1943, in Kreuzberg, Berlin) is a painter, sculptor and multidisciplinary artist. His works incorporates materials such as wood, paper, steal, puppets, glass, bronze, cloth, acrylic glass, and photography. He studied with Marcus Lüpertz at the end of the 1960s. His works incorporate materials such as wood, paper, glass, puppets, and bronze. Attracted to the technology of QR code, he used it as an artistic element. Friedrich grounded QR Matrix Movement. The operas of Richard Wagner have played a role in developing Fred's theme of faith in his work.

His works are often done on a large, confrontational scale and characterised by an unflinching willingness to confront God and believe in the human-beings and their unrealised potential. It is also characteristic of his work to have symbols and legendary figures or historical places. All of these are encoded which Friedrich seeks to process the past; this has resulted in his work being linked with the New Symbolism and Neo-Expressionism movements.

Friedrich has lived and worked in Spain since 1997.

== Personal life and career ==
Friedrich spent his childhood in Wriezen, though his city had been heavily bombed a few months before the end of World War II, causing his family to move. Friedrich grew up in a space of just 14 square meters, where he observed the devastated city of Berlin. They collected rubble and traded scrap for a living. He was dismissed for an alleged lack of appropriation from an early apprenticeship teacher. Friedrich studied craftsmanship, he worked also in mining, road construction and spent a semester at the Berlin University of Arts. His short presence at the academy ended in a "huge fiasco", and he left to continue his studies in the Bauakademie where he studied Architecture and Sculpture, being student of Erich F. Reuter. He received an architecture degree in 1969. Together with George Baselitz, Emanuel Scharfenberg, Fritz Reuter, Gerson Fehrenbach and twelve other artists, Friedrich cofounded the gallery Grossgörschen. Due to the impact of World War II, he was an active member of German student movement 68er. His first piece, following his ideas focused on the field of painting, was in the 1970s, leaving his successful career as an architect.

His output during this first creative time is known as Total Abstraction. In 1994 he grounded Kunsthaus-Berlin, his first studio.

== Work ==
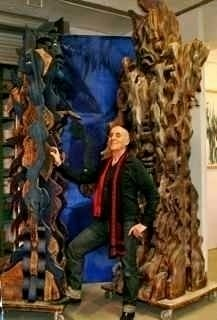
Macht & GewaltArtist Fred Friedrich. Behind Land Art Sculptures, Macht & Gewalt, wood around 275x95x74 cms left, 285x110x90 cms. left.

=== Painting ===
Fred Friedrich is best known for his paintings which have grown increasingly large scale with his particular mixed-media technique, additions of pigments and alchemy. This results in layers of encrusted surfaces and thick impasto to be present in his paintings.

By 1972, while studying informally for few months under Joseph Beuys at Kunstakademie Düsseldorf his stylistic learnings resembled Wolf Vostell´s approach. He work with metal, glass, straw, puppets, cloth, and machines. The use of these materials meant that his art works became temporary and fragile, as Friedrich himself was well aware; he also wanted to showcase the materials in such a way that they were not disguised and could be represented in their natural form. The fragility of his work contrasts with the stark subject matter in his paintings. The use of familiar materials to express ideas was influences be Beuys, Vostell, who used fat, carpet onces and the other machine, metal the other. It is also typical of the Neo-expressionist style.

Friedrich continue working in the architecture branch and in world art in the years that followed he incorporated Greek mythology in particular, in his work, and in the next decade he studied the Bible, as well as other religions like the Muslim, and Jew. he went on extended journeys throughout Europe, Africa, and the Middle East: the latter two journeys further influenced his work. Besides paintings, Friedrich created sculptures, watercolours, photographs and woodcuts, using wood in particular to create huge format sculptures he reuse repeatedly in all media over the next decades, lending his work its knotty thematic coherence.

Throughout the 1970s and early 1980s, Friedrich made numerous paintings, watercolours, installations on themes interpreted by Richard Wagner in his four-opera cycle Der Ring des Nibelungen (The Ring of the Nibelung).

In the early 1980s, he continues, with his architect career but in the mid-1980s Friedrich´s, in the limited of a restrictive opportunity to create with freedom, he decided at the best of his life architect career to begin with his own philosophy. The range of his themes broadened to include references to ancient Hebrew, Muslim and Egyptian history, as in the large painting Götterdämmerung (1998-2018). His paintings of the 1990s. in particular explore the universal myths of existence and meaning. So he moulded his new style and start Friedrich and associated with the avant-garde movement that, setting off, "Abstract Expressionism" and with big movements of his body places his artworks on the ground creating parallel worlds. His works happen for several phases, with the call "under cover painting" and this way he declares "...over there take unchangeable places and unstoppable dimensions of time that they are frozen on the linen". Over the past decade, the photographs that Friedrich took in Africa ″reverberated″ in his mind to suggest a vast array of cultural and historical references, reaching from the first human civilisation of Mesopotamia to the actual human new 3 digital technology.

Friedrich produced a number of works over the course of his career, including *Götterdämmerung*. In 1997, after approximately 20 years of work on *Götterdämmerung*, he left Germany and travelled to several countries, including destinations in Africa, Mexico, China, Thailand, Indonesia, Australia, and Egypt. After working in several medias and workshops, Friedrich´s began developing the revolutionary style for which he is known. His abstraction as he turned his thoughts towards experimentation with the elements of design. Friedrich´s earlier abstract figures deal principally with cut figures in mass, while his later ones contrasts the solid elements of the sculpture with the space, under the influence of the Toltec-Mayan figure. This later, more abstract heads, by which Friedrich explores and alternates concave and convex shapes. Friedrich´s sculptures made many preparatory sketches and drawings for each sculpture. Most of these sketchbooks and photomontage are in collection at Museo Fred Friedrich. He placed great importance on drawing, taking photo shoots which he analysed light, form and colour of each sculpture. Friedrich built up a collection of natural objects; skulls, rocks, metals, wood, which he would use to provide inspiration for organic forms. For his largest works, he usually produced a half-scale, working model before scaling up for the final moulding and casing at a bronze foundry. Friedrich often refined the final full plaster shape and directed the patina with a team and himself.

== List of Works ==
He created several collections which are exhibited in several museums.

- ″Fin de Ciel″ with more than forty paintings, thirty bronze sculpture that refer in their titles inscription to the Popol Vuh text recounting the mythology and history of the Kʼicheʼ people, one of the Maya peoples, who inhabit Guatemala and the Mexican states of Chiapas, Campeche, Yucatan and Quintana Roo, as well as areas of Belize and Honduras.
- Siete Hijas de Eva
- Teotihuacan
- Chichen Itza
- Kopf-los inspired by Ancient Maya Civilisation culture he created a round 40 bronze head sculptures. One becomes an explorer mining through dazzling fields of opulent vision overflowing with imagery reminiscent of exotic lands.
- Cuadros Negros
- Hijos del Sol
- Tzolkin
- Mana
- Exodus
- Cuadros azules
- Placebo

From 1994 to 2003, he produced different sizes painting about the cosmos. He also started to turn to sculpture, although lead still remained his preferred medium.

== Exhibitions ==
In 1998 with the collaboration of the prestigious Museum in Cologne Germany, the Museum Ludwig mounted together a retrospective where Cuba culture expresses ideas and philosophy about his culture and political position.

The multidisciplinary artist satisfies the most demanding criteria of the German and world culture. He performed exhibitions, along with Helmut Schober, in the Angel Orensanz Center New York City showing up his Darwinian and pantheism convictions, where he used the 4th. postulate to declare

"... the ascending world harmony and all living beings exist. just during the natural selection, in Nature nothing is arbitrary and random and all has an order that demands a project".

Museo-Casa Diego Rivera and Museo Jumex mounted several exhibition where Mexico critics where astonished about the artworks. Exhibitions in Marbella, Spain, at prestigious Museum Cortijo de Miraflores, where sustaining Fin de Ciel exhibited one of the Collection called Hijos del Sol philosophy and maya culture about December 2012 marked the conclusion of a bʼakʼtun—a time period in the Mesoamerican Long Count calendar, used in Central America prior to the arrival of Europeans. Although the Long Count was most likely invented by the Olmec, that is the last Maya 2012 year where drama, chaos, reaction, and all changeable forms are involved in an inherent mystic fractal of the future.

At present time bronze sculpture Ixbalanque is exhibited at Museo Whitney New York City in Chelsea.

The promotion and contribution supporting more artists of any gender, status, religion, color is shown out in exhibitions Serie Museo belongs to All, meaning a serie of several exhibitions at Museo Fred Friedrich.

== Recognition ==
This award-winning artist is one of the first Digital Artist of the moment and has had exhibited internationally, showcasing his art in solo and group exhibitions in Italy, Spain, Portugal, Ireland, England, India, (Germany), Mexico and United States.

Premio de Pintura Focus- Abengoa in Sevilla, in Bienal del Milenio in Granada, The Open West in Gloucester Cathedral, in Art Prize laguna 2012 in Venice, in Premios Iberoamericanos Cortés de Cádiz and on the Royal Academy of Arts with the artwork "Madonna QR".

== See also ==
- QR code
- List of German painters
- Postmodern
- Neoexpressionism
- Abstract expressionism
- Sculpture
- Action Painting
- Digital art
- Avant-garde
