= Turuñuelo =

Bronze age archaeological site in Guareña, Spain

Coordinates: 38°56′57″N 06°03′53″W

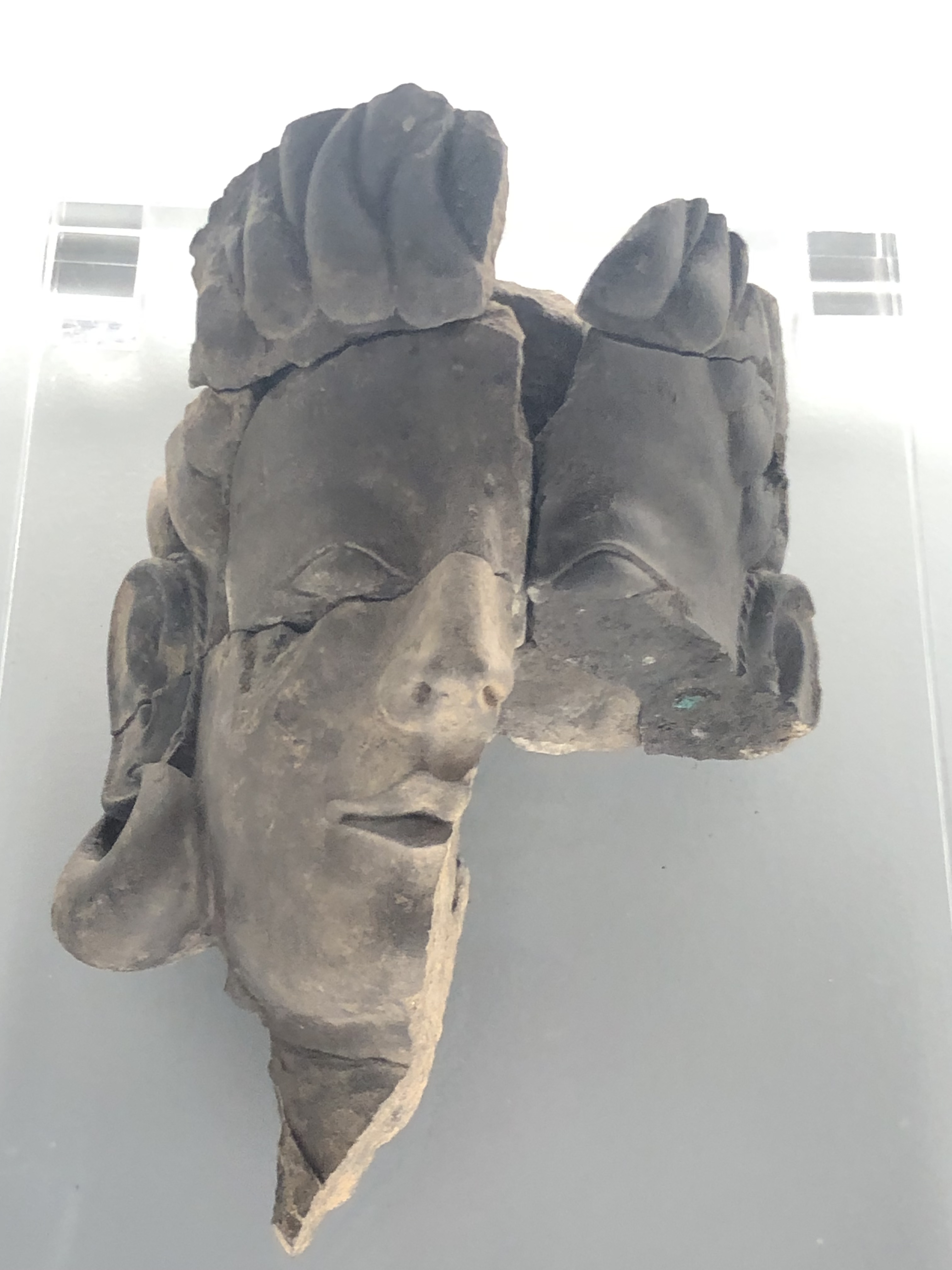
Face found in the site in 2023. It features earrings characteristic of the Tartessian goldsmith work.

El Turuñuelo, also called Casas del Turuñuelo and El Turuñuelo de Guareña, is an archaeological site in Guareña, province of Badajoz, Spain. It corresponds to the late Tartessian culture developed in the Middle Guadiana Valley in the southwestern Iberian Peninsula in the 5th century BCE after the downfall of the Tartessian archaeological culture's main core around the Guadalquivir valley by the end of the 6th century BCE. It consists of a huge 2,500-year-old two-floor building which was ritually set on fire and buried after a hecatomb-like ceremony was performed.

The mound under which the building is located was already known since the 1980s. The earliest digging works began in 2015. As of 2021, there were another 12 similar structures identified in the region, of which only two, Cancho Roano (Zalamea de la Serena) and La Mata (Campanario) had been excavated. The site was declared bien de interés cultural in May 2022.

The six last steps of the courtyard stairs in the site singularly display the use of lime mortar.

== Sculptural representations ==
In April of 2023, several sculptures that represent the first human representations of Tartessian culture were discovered. They were found during the fifth excavation campaign carried out by a CSIC team at the Casas de Turuñuelo site.

These are five unusual anthropomorphic busts dating from the 5th century BC, and they represent a paradigm shift in the iconic interpretation of Tartessian culture. Until then, it was believed to be aniconic because it represented divinity only through animal or plant motifs, or through betyls (sacred stones). Esther Rodríguez, from the team at the Mérida Institute of Archaeology, mentioned at the press conference held on the same day that "This discovery changes the reading of art history."
