= Cortijo =

Spanish traditional rural dwelling

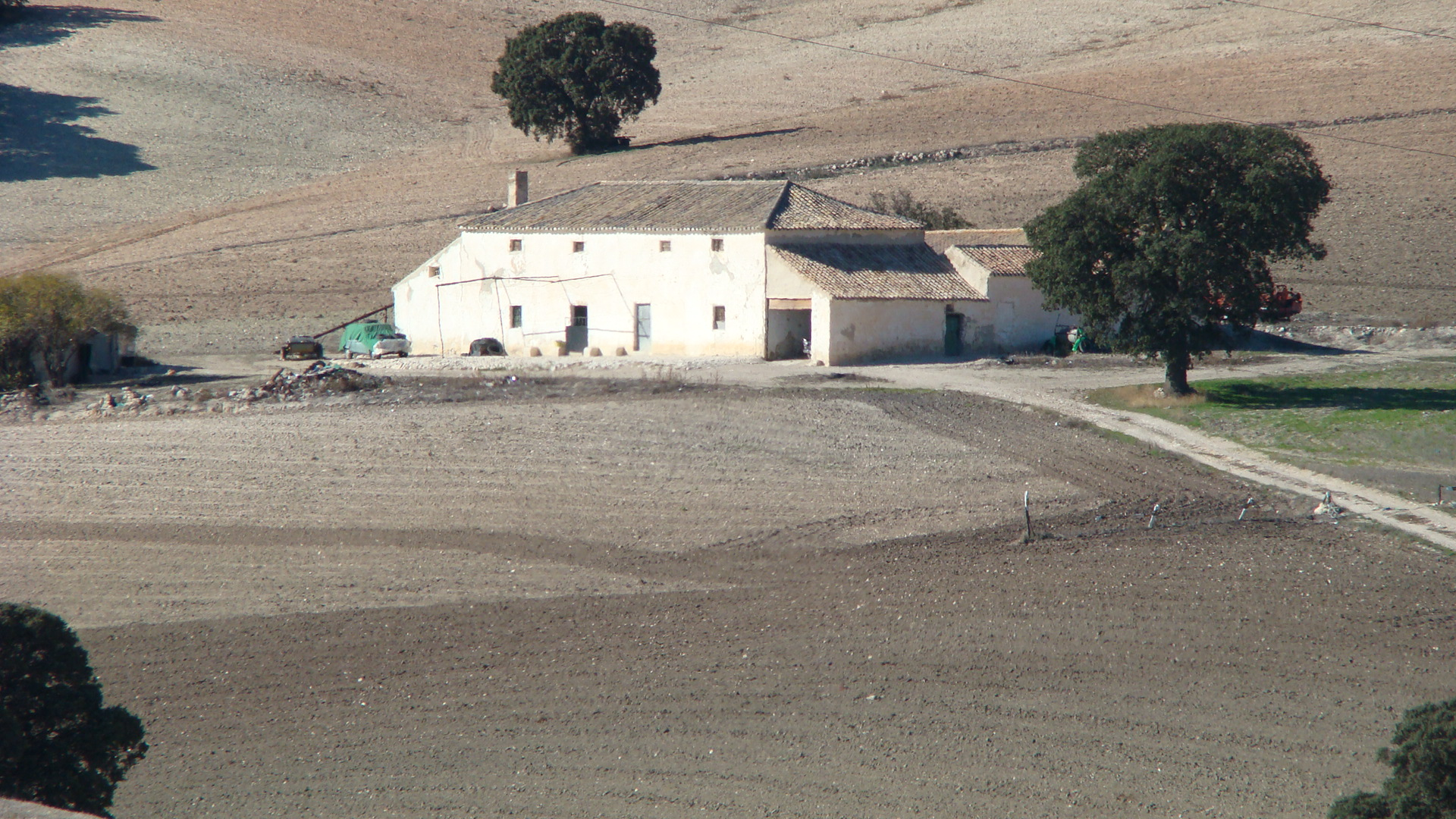
A cortijo near Píñar, Granada province, Spain.

A cortijo is a type of traditional rural dwelling (akin to the German Bauernhof, also known as a farmhouse in English) in the southern half of Spain, including all of Andalusia and parts of Extremadura and Castilla–La Mancha.

Cortijos may have their origins in ancient Roman villas, for the word is derived from the Latin cohorticulum, a diminutive of cohors, meaning 'courtyard' or inner enclosure. They are often isolated structures associated with a large family farm or livestock management in the adjoining lands.

== Description ==
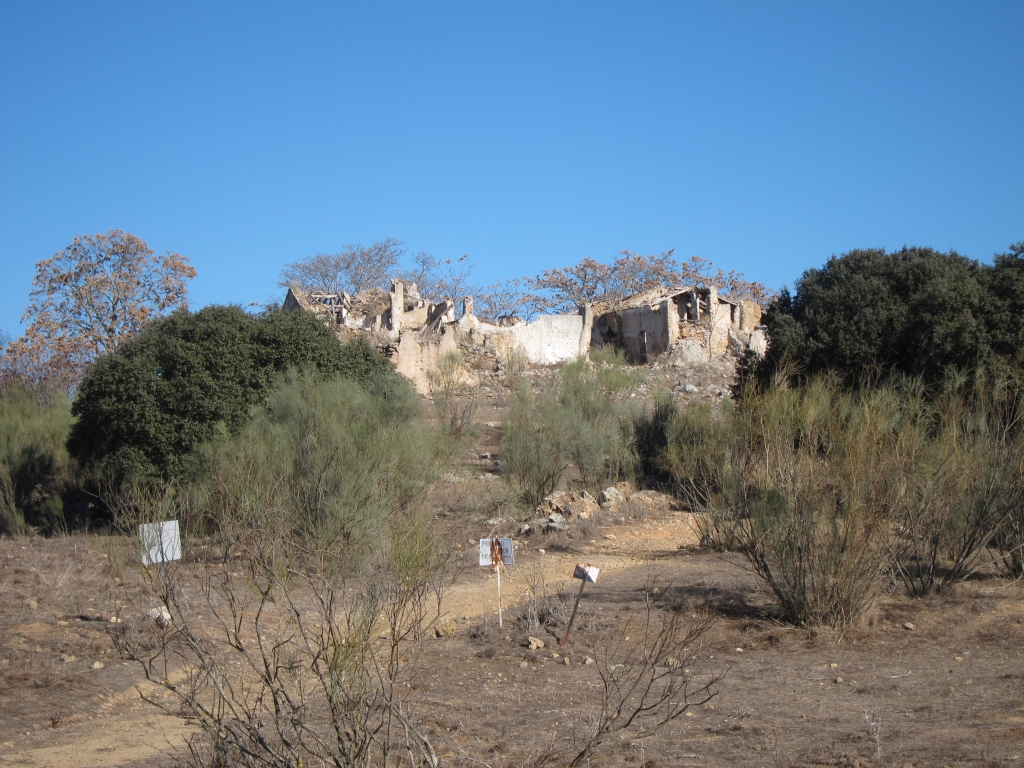
Ruins of an abandoned cortijo in the Archidona, Málaga Province

A cortijo would usually include a large house, together with accessory buildings such as workers' quarters, sheds to house livestock, granaries, oil mills, barns and often a wall limiting the enclosure where there were no buildings surrounding it. It was also common for isolated cortijos to include a small chapel.

In mountain areas, rough stone was often used for wall construction and ashlar for corners, doorways, windows and arches. In ancient cortijos, mud or slaked lime were used as mortar. However, the traditional materials were replaced by cement and brick construction in more recent ones. In places where stone was hard to come by, adobe was more common as a construction material. Cortijos were often whitewashed. Roofs were built with wooden beam structures and covered with red ceramic roof tiles.

The master of the cortijo or "señorito" would usually live with his family in a two-story building when visiting, while the accessory structures were for the labourers and their families —also known as "cortijeros". The latter buildings were usually of more simple construction.

The cortijo was usually a habitat surrounded by extensive lands, such as olive groves or other kinds of agricultural exploitation. In certain desolate areas of the southern Meseta Central, Extremadura and Sierra Morena, a cortijo would be the only inhabited center for many miles around. Thus, most of them were self-sufficient units, as far as that was possible.

Many cortijos became deserted following Francisco Franco's Stabilization Plan of 1959 and the abandonment of traditional agricultural practices by the local youth, including the lifestyle changes that swept over rural Spain during the second half of the 20th century.

== Famous cortijos ==
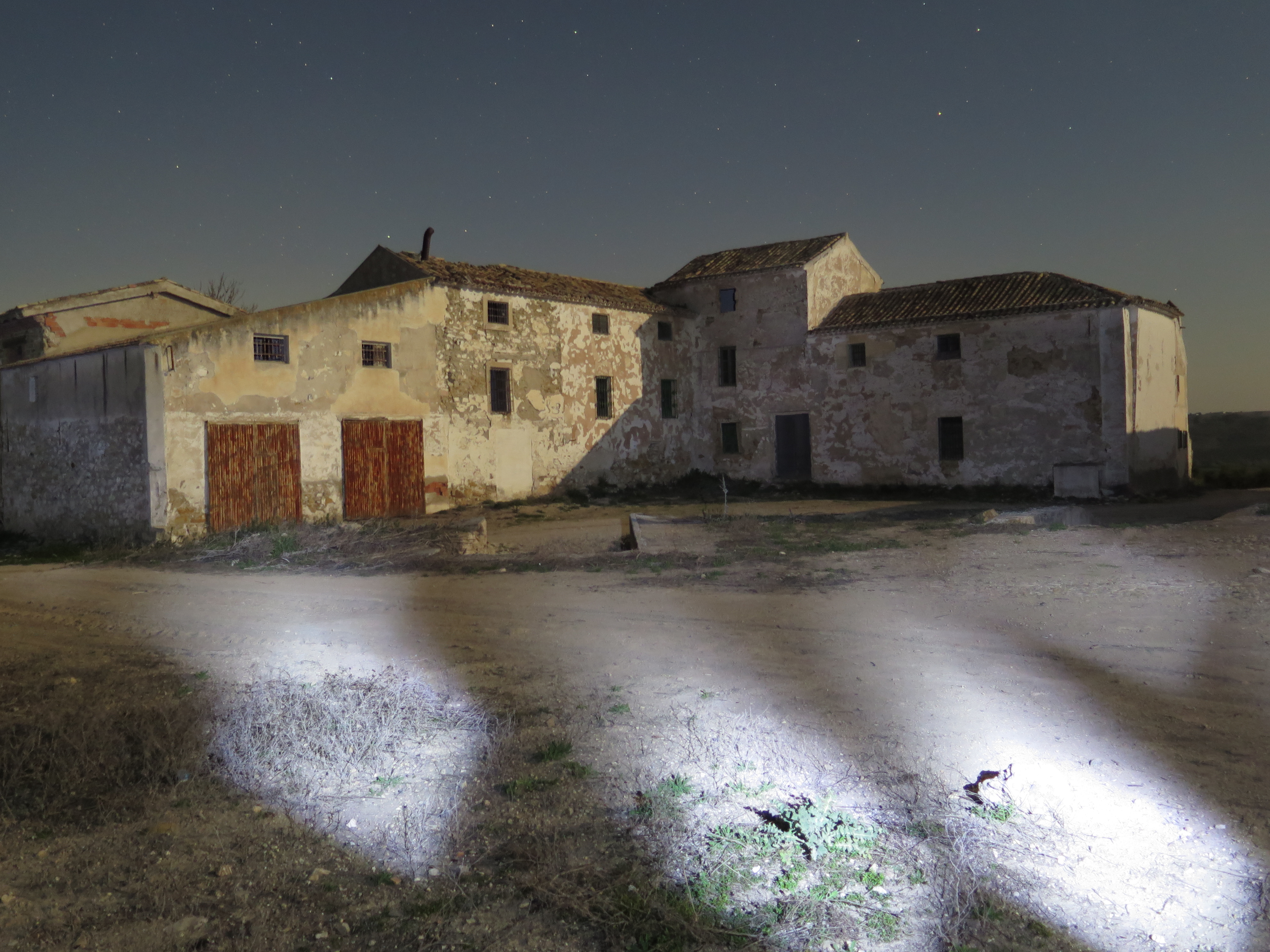
Night view of the abandoned Cortijos de Platero, in the municipality of Jaén

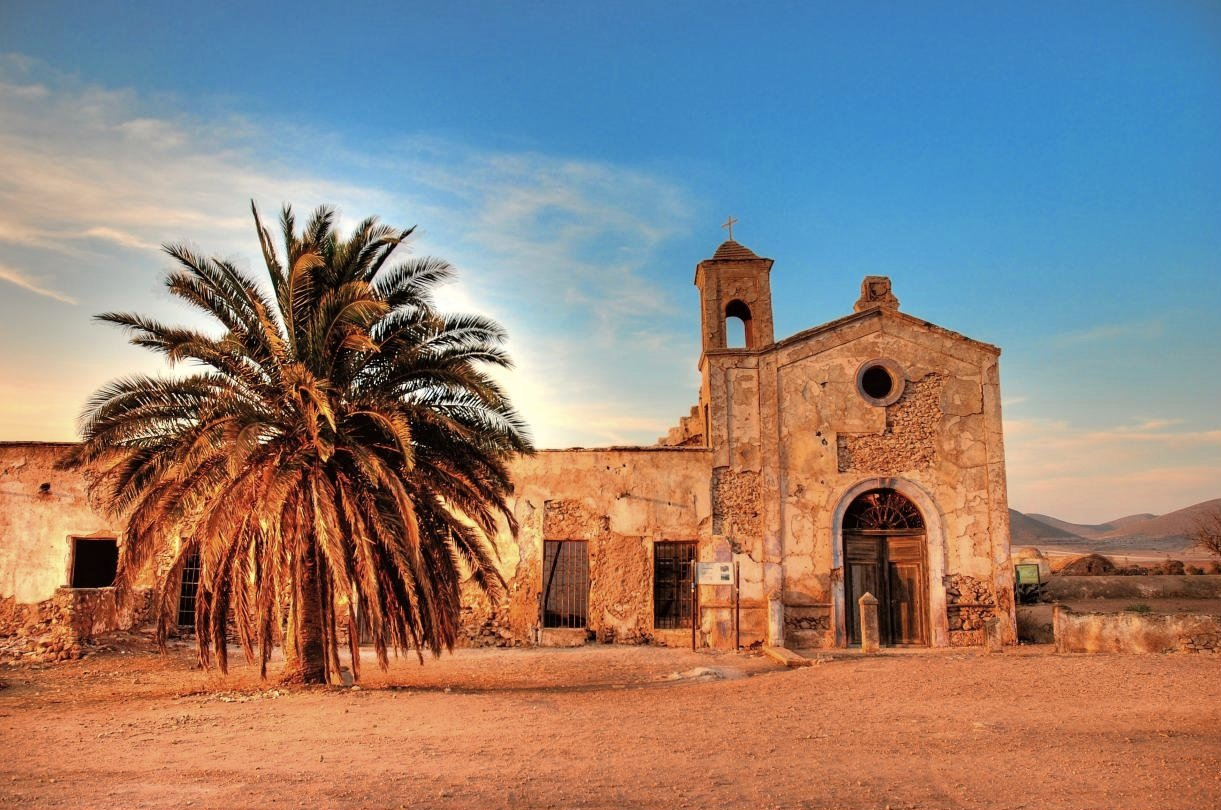
View of the chapel of the Cortijo del Fraile

- Cortijo de Arroyovil, where Francisco Franco used to overnight when hunting, near Mancha Real.
- Cortijo de Miraflores, a historical building in Marbella.
- Cortijo Jurado, near Campanillas; reputed to be haunted.
- Cortijo de las Mezquitas, located between Antequera, Campillos and Sierra de Yeguas.
- Cortijo de Alventu, located near río Guadalquivir.
- Cortijo Bacardí, located in Málaga
- Cortijo del Fraile, in Níjar municipality, known as the scene of a crime.
- Cortijo de Aparicio el Grande
- Cortijo Cañaveral de los Frailes
- Cortijo del Búho in Riópar, Albacete Province
- El Cortijo, a nightclub in Barcelona.
- Casa Zaldívar, a cortijo in Casas de Don Pedro that became a Francoist concentration camp where Spanish Republican military personnel were interned and where many were shot. at the time of the Spanish Civil War.
- Cortijo del Enjembraero, located in Helechal, Benquerencia de la Serena municipality, where four political prisoners: Sinesio Calderón, Antonio Cortés, Antonio Iglesias and Manuel Merinot were executed extrajudicially on 1 February 1949 accused by the Francoist authorities of assisting the Spanish Maquis.
- Cortijo del Carmen and cortijo de San Patricio, the scene of the crime of Gádor.

== See also ==
- Alquería
- Hacienda
