= Adolf Schulten =

German historian and archaeologist (1870–1960)

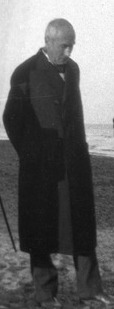
- Adolf Schulten in 1932
- Born: 27 May 1870; Elberfeld, Rhine Province
- Died: 19 March 1960 (aged 89); Erlangen, Bavaria
- Education: University of Bonn; University of Erlangen
- Scientific career
- Fields: History, archaeology and geology

Adolf Schulten (27 May 1870 – 19 March 1960) was a German historian and archaeologist.

Schulten was born in Elberfeld, Rhine Province, and received a doctorate in geology from the University of Bonn in 1892. He studied in Italy, Africa and Greece with support from the Institute of Archaeology. After obtaining the chair of ancient history at the University of Erlangen, he continued his work in Spain with great dedication and to this day is considered a key influence upon archaeological study in Spain.

Schulten led the 1905-12 excavations of the Celtiberian city of Numantia and the Roman camps nearby and in 1924 searched without success for the location of Tartessos. Starting in 1948 he worked on the ruins of Tarraco and in the localities of Mainake, Munda and Segeda.

In recognition of his work, Schulten received a doctorate honoris causa from the University of Barcelona and the Grand Cross of the Civil Order of Alfonso X, the Wise, from the Spanish state in 1940. He was a member of the Institutes of Archaeology and History at the Patria de Módena and was a lead writer for the Austrian Institute of Archaeology and the Academy of the History of Madrid.

His works feature Numantia, in Die Keltiberer und ihre Kriege mit Rom (1914); Tartessos (1924); Viriato; Sertorius; L'amour, l'amour est la véritable clef de l'Histoire; Los cántabros y astures y su guerra con Roma (1943) is Schulten's most important monograph on his excavations.
