= María Dolores Aguilar =

Spanish entrepreneur and politician

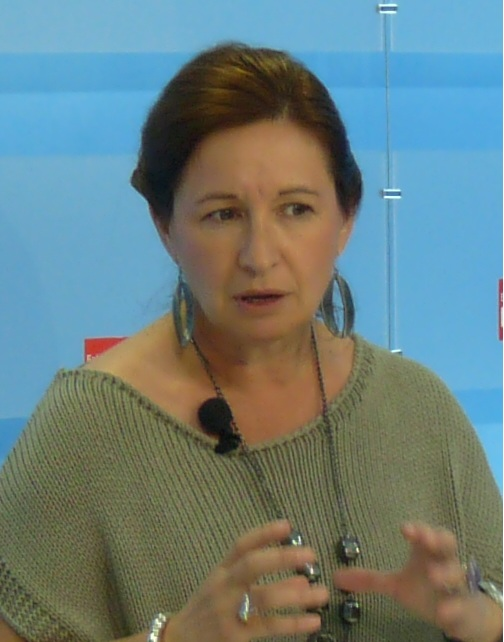
María Dolores Aguilar

María Dolores Aguilar Seco (born in Castuera, Spain in 1958) is a Spanish entrepreneur and socialist politician. She holds a Ph.D. in politics and sociology from the Universidad Complutense de Madrid. She served as Second Vice-President of Economic Affairs and Ministry of Economy, Trade and Innovation for the regional Government of Extremadura from 2007 to 2011. She has also held other positions during her political career:

- Director General of Migrations of the Junta of Extremadura (2001–2003)
- Deputy for Badajoz in the Assembly of Extremadura (2007–2011)
- Counselor of Economy, Commerce and Innovation for the Board of Extremadura (2007–2011)
