= Zarza-Capilla =

- Municipality
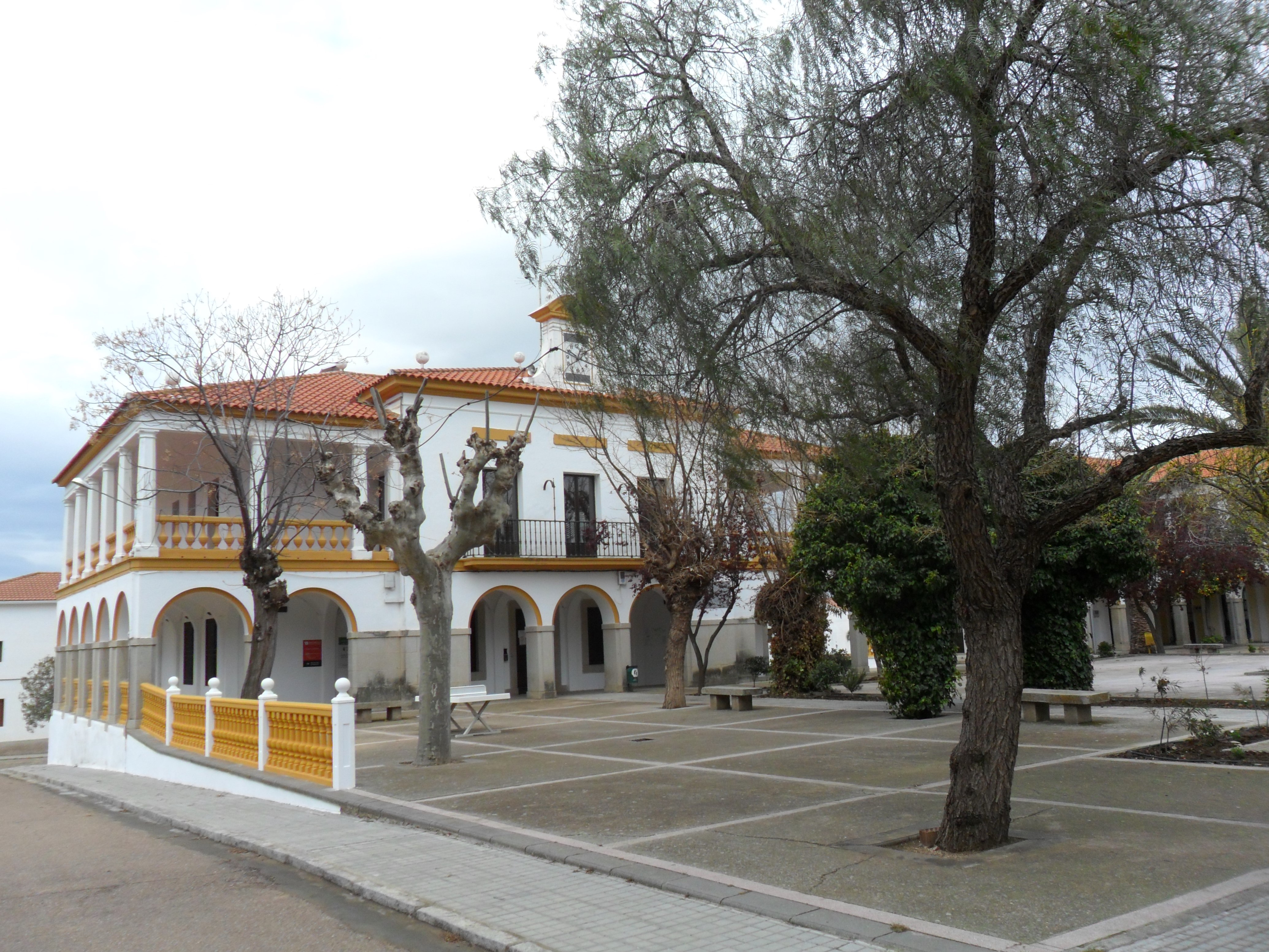
- Town hall

- Coat of arms

- Location in Spain
- Coordinates: 38°48′N 5°10′W
- Country: Spain
- Autonomous community: Extremadura
- Province: Badajoz
- Comarca: La Serena

Government
  - Alcalde: Francisco Javier Sánchez Caballero

Area
  - Total: 92 km^{2} (36 sq mi)
- Elevation: 579 m (1,900 ft)

Population (2025-01-01)
  - Total: 295
  - Density: 3.2/km^{2} (8.3/sq mi)
- Time zone: UTC+1 (CET)
  - Summer (DST): UTC+2 (CEST)
- Website: Ayuntamiento de Zarza-Capilla

Zarza-Capilla is a Spanish municipality in the province of Badajoz, Extremadura. According to the 2014 census, the municipality has a population of 363 inhabitants.

== See also ==
- List of municipalities in Badajoz
