= Tartessos =

Historical civilization in the southern Iberian Peninsula

Coordinates: 37.0000°N 6.2000°W

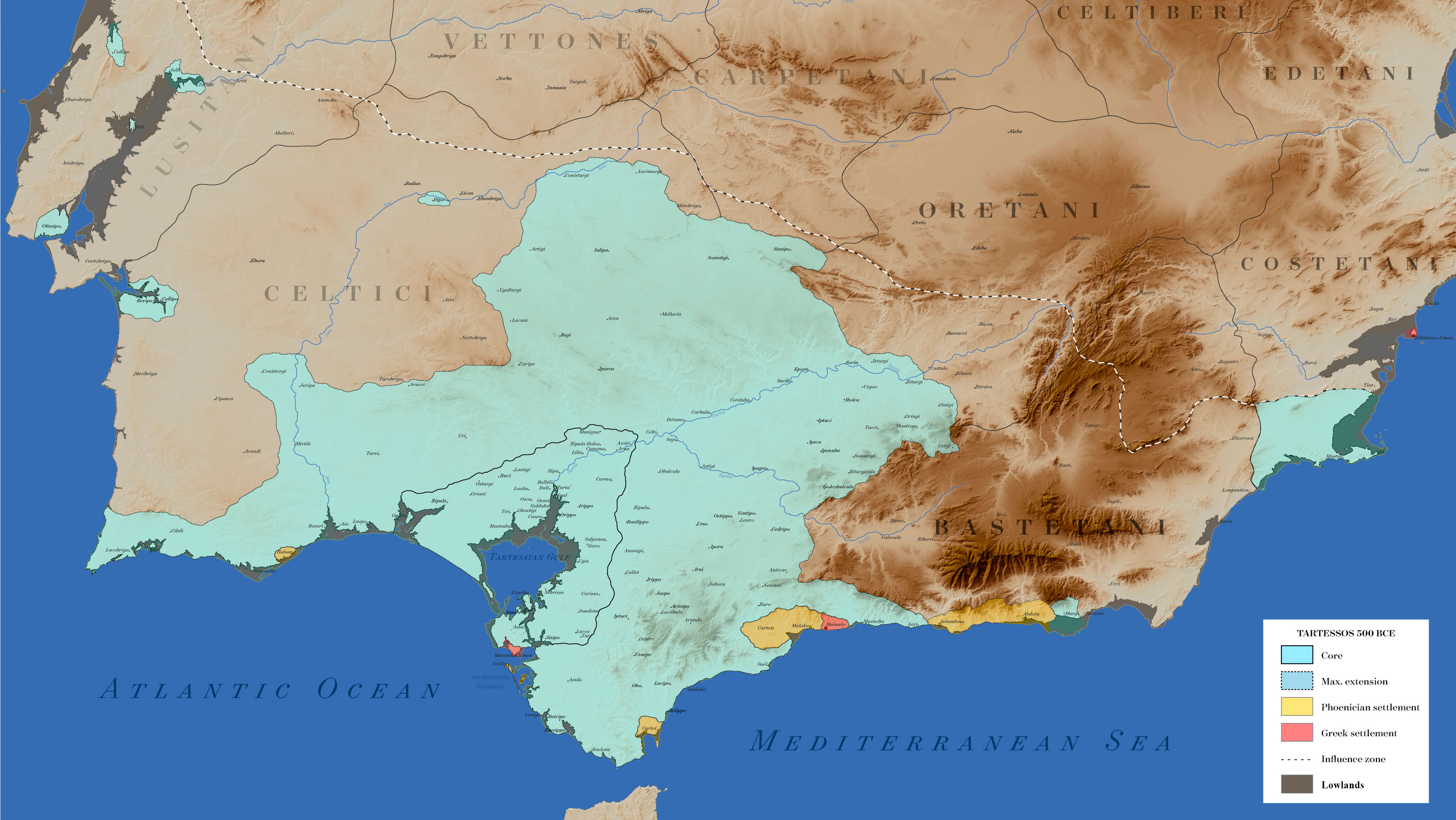
Tartessos, circa 500 BC

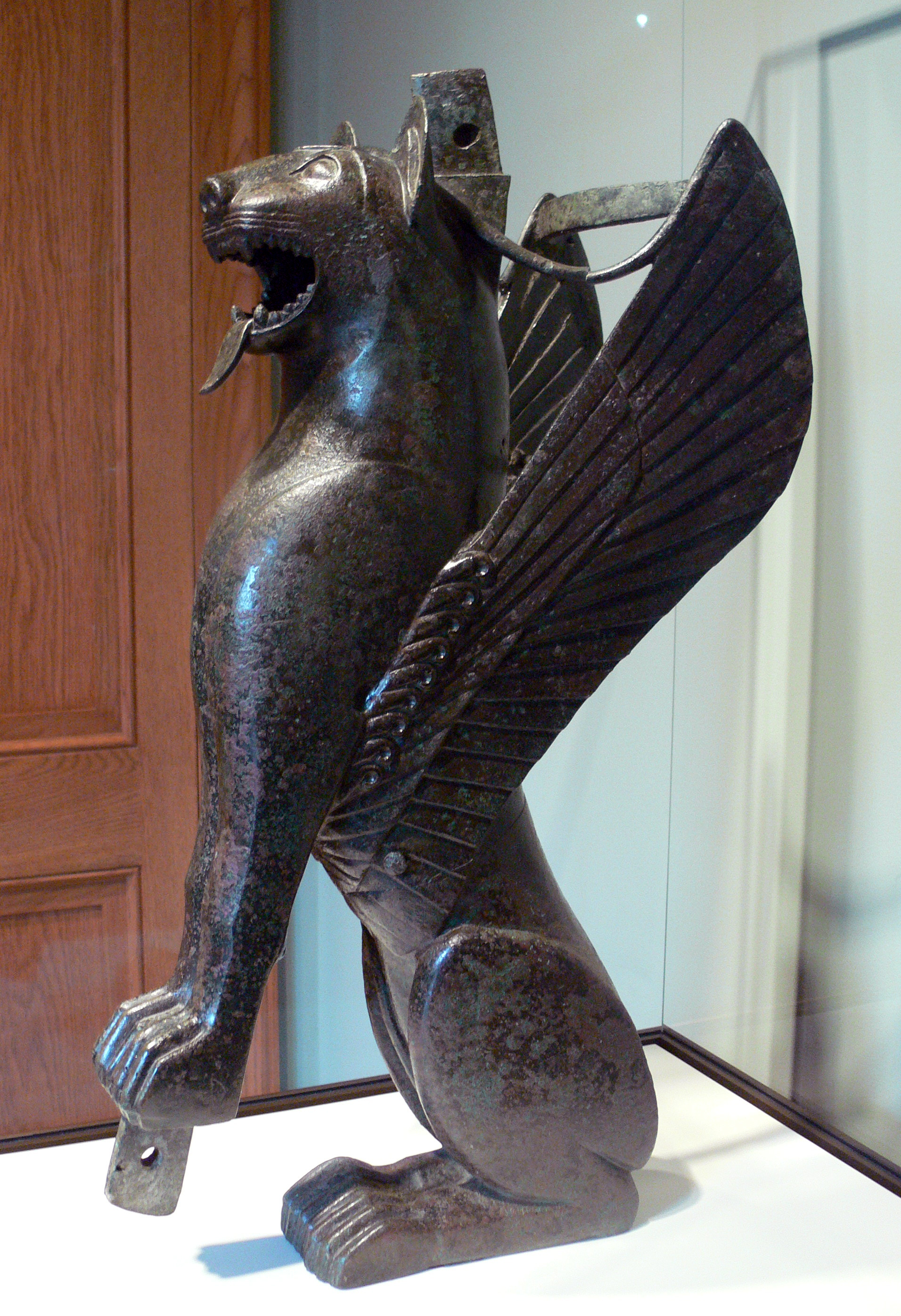
Tartessian winged feline statue at the Getty Villa

Tartessos (Spanish: Tartesos) is, as defined by archaeological discoveries, a historical civilization settled in the southern Iberian Peninsula from about the late Bronze Age until the 5th century BC. It had a writing system, known as the Southwest script, that includes some 97 inscriptions in an unknown language which is unclassified for lack of data. Tartessos was the first "entity located in southwestern Iberia to be recognised as a kingdom".

In historical records, Tartessos (Ancient Greek: Ταρτησσός) appears as a semi-mythical or legendary harbor city and the surrounding culture on the south coast of the Iberian Peninsula (in modern Andalusia, Spain), at the mouth of the Guadalquivir. It appears in sources from Greece and the Near East starting during the first millennium BC. Herodotus, for example, describes it as beyond the Pillars of Hercules. Roman authors tend to echo the earlier Greek sources, but from around the end of the millennium there are indications that the name Tartessos had fallen out of use and the city may have been lost to flooding, although several authors attempt to identify it with cities of other names in the area.

The Tartessians were rich in metals. In the fourth century BC the historian Ephorus describes "a very prosperous market called Tartessos, with much tin carried by river, as well as gold and copper from Celtic lands". Trade in tin was very lucrative in the Bronze Age, since it is an essential component of bronze and is comparatively rare. Herodotus said a king of Tartessos, Arganthonios, welcomed the first Greeks to reach Iberia, Phocaeans who had sailed from Asia Minor.

Pausanias wrote that, to commemorate an Olympic victory, the Sicyonian tyrant Myron built an Ionic treasury of bronze from Tartessos.

The people of Tartessos became important trading partners of the Phoenicians, whose presence in Iberia dates from the eighth century BC and who built a nearby harbor of their own, Gadir (Ancient Greek: Γάδειρα, Latin: Gades, present-day Cádiz).

== Location ==
Tartessos location on the Iberian Peninsula

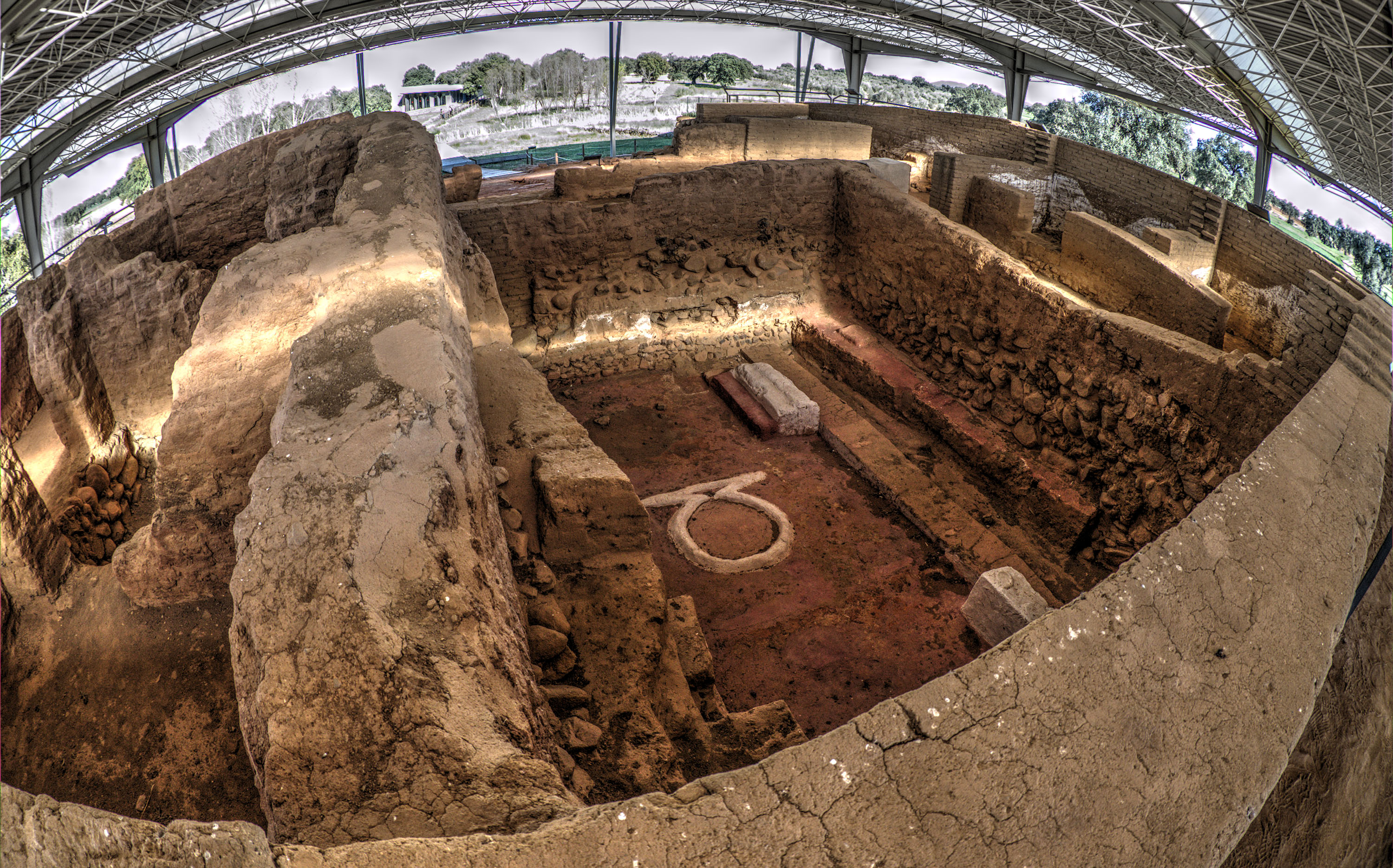
Cancho Roano archaeological site located in Zalamea de la Serena, Extremadura

Several early sources, such as Aristotle, refer to Tartessos as a river. Aristotle claims that it rises from the Pyrene Mountain ( accepted by some modern scholars as the Pyrenees) and flows out to sea outside the Pillars of Hercules, the modern Strait of Gibraltar. No such river traverses the Iberian Peninsula.

According to the fourth-century BC Greek geographer and explorer Pytheas, quoted by Strabo in the first century AD, the ancestral homeland of the Turduli was located north of Turdetania, the region where the kingdom of Tartessos was located in the Baetis River valley (the present-day Guadalquivir valley) in southern Spain.

Pausanias, writing in the second century AD, identified the river and gave details of the location of the city:

They say that Tartessus is a river in the land of the Iberians, running down into the sea by two mouths and that between these two mouths lies a city of the same name. The river, which is the largest in Iberia and tidal, those of a later day called Baetis and there are some who think that Tartessus was the ancient name of Carpia, a city of the Iberians.

The river known in his day as the Baetis is now the Guadalquivir. Thus, according to the German historian Adolf Schulten, Tartessos may be buried under the shifting wetlands near the mouth of the Guadalquivir. The river delta has gradually been blocked by a sandbar that stretches from the mouth of the Rio Tinto, near Palos de la Frontera, to Almonte, the riverbank that is opposite Sanlúcar de Barrameda. The area is now protected as the Parque Nacional de Doñana. (Note: Thirty kilometers inland there still is a mining town by the name of Tarsis.)

In the first century AD, Pliny the Elder incorrectly identified the city of Carteia as the Tartessos mentioned in Greek sources, while Strabo just described the area without mentioning Tartessos. Carteia is identified as El Rocadillo, near S. Roque, Province of Cádiz, some distance away from the Guadalquivir. In the second century AD, Appian thought that Karpessos (Carpia) was previously known as Tartessos.

== Archaeological discoveries ==
The discoveries published by Adolf Schulten in 1922 first drew attention to Tartessos and shifted its study from classical philologists and antiquarians to investigations based on archaeology, although attempts at localizing a capital for what was conceived as a complicated culture in the nature of a centrally controlled kingdom ancestral to Spain were inconclusively debated. Subsequent discoveries were widely reported: in September 1923 archaeologists discovered a Phoenician necropolis in which human remains were unearthed and stones found with illegible characters. It may have been colonized by the Phoenicians for trade because of its richness in metals.

A later generation turned instead to identifying and localizing "orientalizing" (eastern Mediterranean) features of the Tartessian material culture within the broader Mediterranean horizon of an "Orientalizing period" recognizable in the Aegean and Etruria.

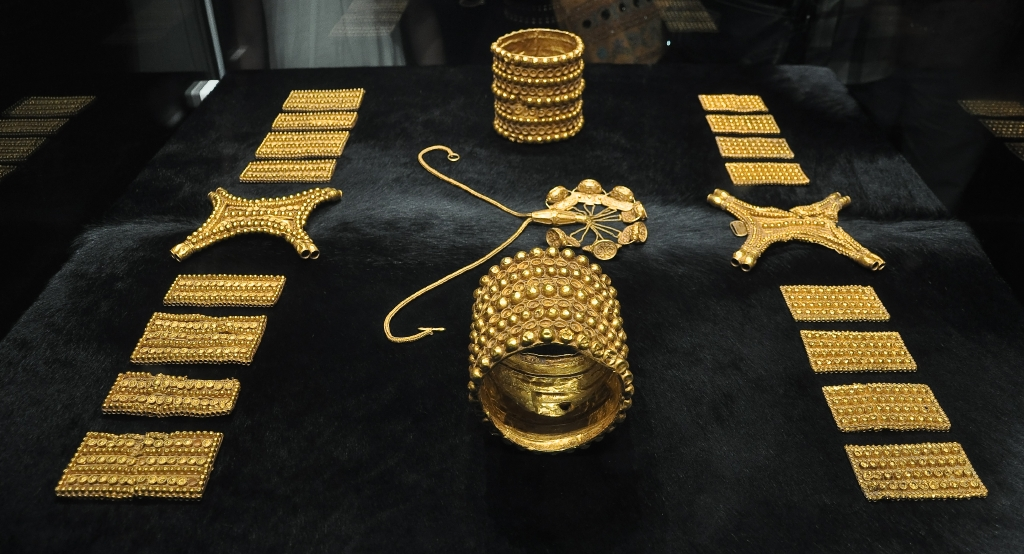
Treasure of El Carambolo, exhibited in the Archaeological Museum of Seville

J. M. Luzón was the first to identify Tartessos with modern Huelva, based on discoveries made in the preceding decades. Since the discovery in September 1958 of the rich gold Treasure of El Carambolo in Camas, Seville, three kilometres west of Seville, and of hundreds of artefacts in the necropolis at La Joya, Huelva, archaeological surveys have been integrated with philological and literary surveys and the broader picture of the Iron Age in the Mediterranean basin to provide a more informed view of the supposed Tartessian culture on the ground, concentrated in western Andalusia, Extremadura, and in southern Portugal from the Algarve to the Vinalopó River in Alicante.

=== Turuñuelo archaeological site ===
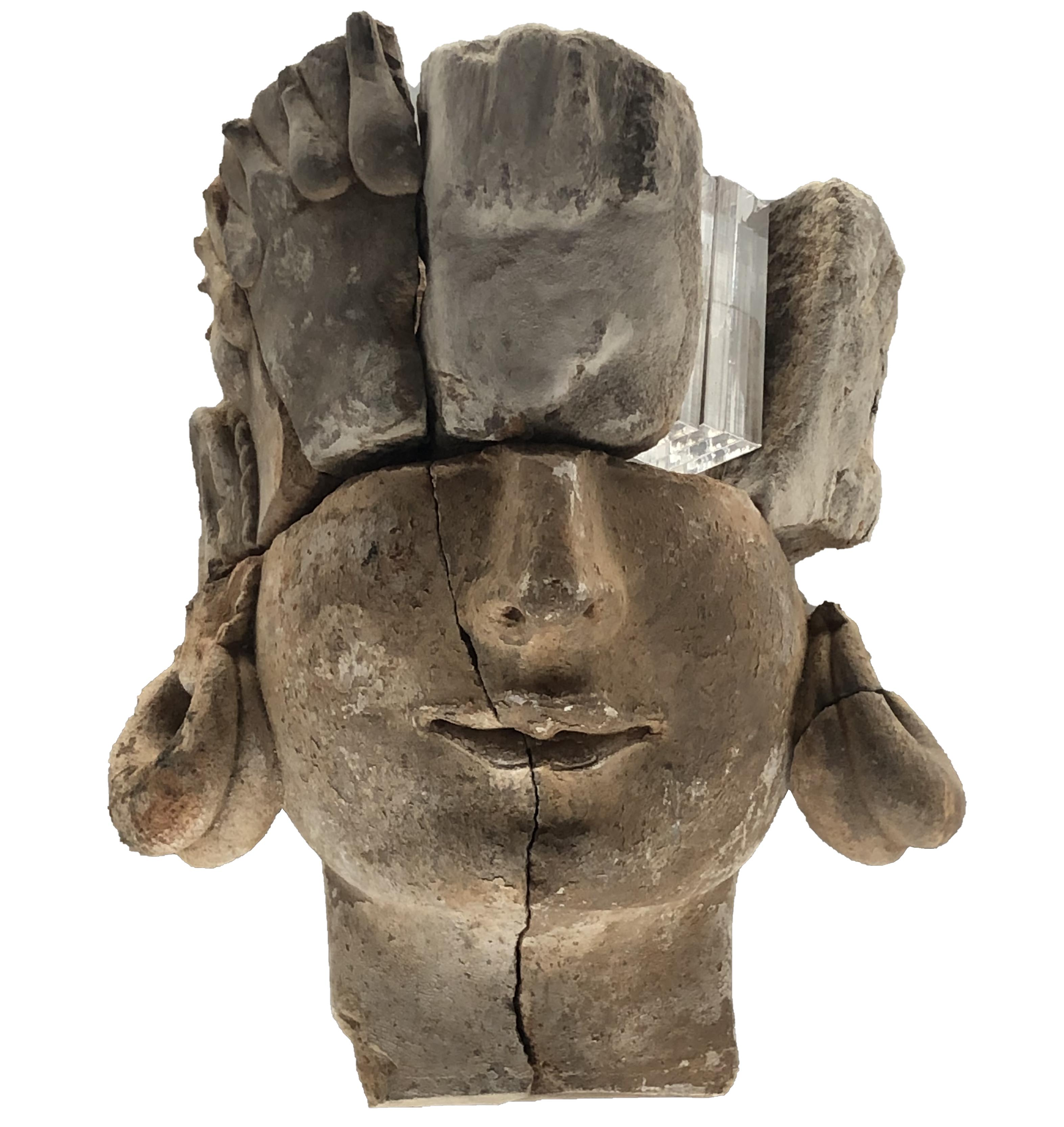
Sculpture found at the site of Turuñuelo, featuring the earrings characteristic of a Tartessian goldsmith's work

Significant discoveries were made at Turuñuelo archeological site in Guareña, where excavation began in 2015. The site was declared bien de interés cultural (national heritage site) in May 2022.

Two ornate stone busts, featuring details of jewelry and hairstyles which are thought to be the first facial representations of the Tartessian goddesses, were discovered in 2023.

These sculptures are somewhat similar to the Lady of Elche sculpture from Alicante, which are dated between the 5th and 4th centuries BC, considerably earlier. Fragments of at least three other busts have also been recovered and one of them is attributed to a warrior because part of his helmet is preserved.

In this region of southern Spain, the Tartessian culture was born around the 9th century BC as a result of hybridization between Phoenician settlers and the local inhabitants. Scholars refer to the Tartessian culture as "a hybrid archaeological culture".

=== Metallurgy ===
Alluvial tin was panned in Tartessian streams from an early date. The spread of a silver standard in Assyria increased its attractiveness (the tribute from Phoenician cities was assessed in silver). The invention of coinage in the 7th century BC spurred the search for bronze and silver as well. Henceforth trade connections, formerly largely in elite goods, assumed an increasingly broad economic role. By the Late Bronze Age, silver extraction in Huelva Province reached industrial proportions. Pre-Roman silver slag is found in the Tartessian cities of Huelva Province. Cypriot and Phoenician metalworkers produced 15 million tons of pyrometallurgical residues at the vast dumps of Riotinto. Mining and smelting preceded the arrival, from the 8th century BC onward, of Phoenicians (Note: Phoenician coastal settlements and necropoli are typically located at the mouth of rivers, on the first hill behind the delta, at Cádiz, Málaga, Granada, and Almería.) and then Greeks, who provided a stimulating wider market and whose influence sparked an "orientalizing" phase in Tartessian material culture (c. 750–550 BC) before Tartessian culture was superseded by the Classic Iberian culture.

"Tartessic" artefacts linked with the Tartessos culture have been found, and many archaeologists now associate the "lost" city with Huelva. In excavations on spatially restricted sites in the center of modern Huelva, sherds of elite painted Greek ceramics of the first half of the 6th century BC have been recovered. Huelva contains the largest accumulation of imported elite goods and must have been an important Tartessian center. Medellín, on the Guadiana River, revealed an important necropolis.

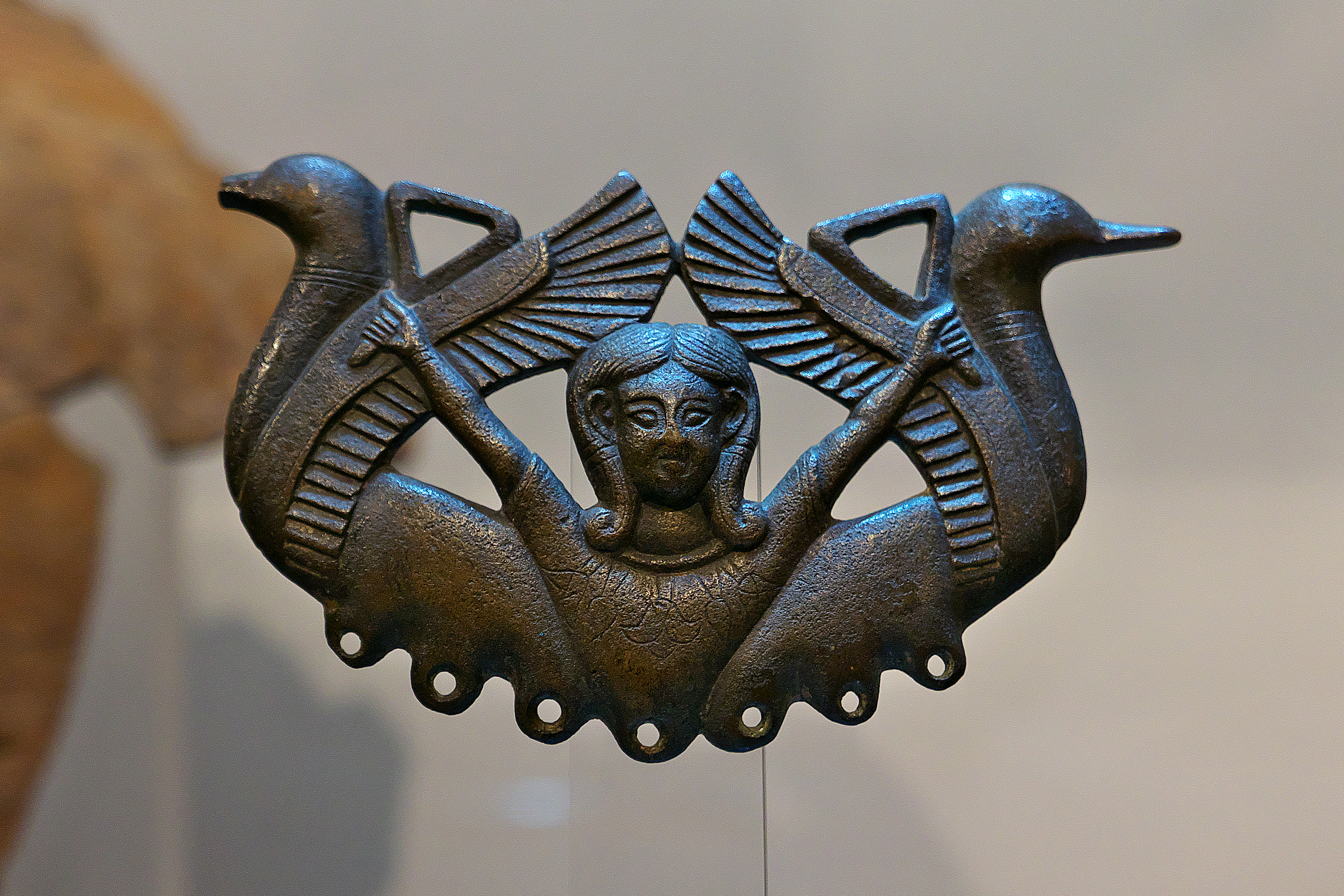
Bronce Carriazo (625–525 BC), found near Seville

Elements specific to Tartessian culture are the Late Bronze Age fully evolved pattern-burnished wares and geometrically banded and patterns "Carambolo" wares, from the 9th to the 6th centuries BC; an "Early Orientalizing" phase with the first eastern Mediterranean imports, beginning circa 750 BC; a "Late Orientalizing" phase with the finest bronze casting and goldsmith work; and gray ware turned on the fast potter's wheel, thought to be local imitations of imported Phoenician red-slip wares.

Characteristic Tartessian bronzes include pear-shaped jugs, often associated in burials, with shallow dish-shaped braziers having loop handles, incense-burners with floral motifs, fibulas, both elbowed and double-spring types, and belt buckles.

No pre-colonial necropolis sites have been identified. The change from a late Bronze Age pattern of circular or oval huts scattered on a village site to rectangular houses with dry-stone foundations and plastered wattle and daub walls took place during the 7th and 6th centuries BC, in settlements with planned layouts that succeeded one another on the same site.

At Cástulo (Jaén), a mosaic of river pebbles from the end of the 6th century BC is the earliest mosaic recorded in Western Europe.

== Timeline (10th–5th century BC) ==
Tartessic occupation sites of the Late Bronze Age were not particularly complex: "a domestic mode of production seems to have predominated" is one mainstream assessment. An earlier generation of archaeologists and historians took a normative approach to the primitive Tartessian adoption of Punic styles and techniques, as of a less-developed culture adopting better, more highly evolved cultural traits, and finding Eastern parallels for Early Iron Age material culture at the Tartessian sites. A later generation has been more concerned with the process through which local institutions evolved.

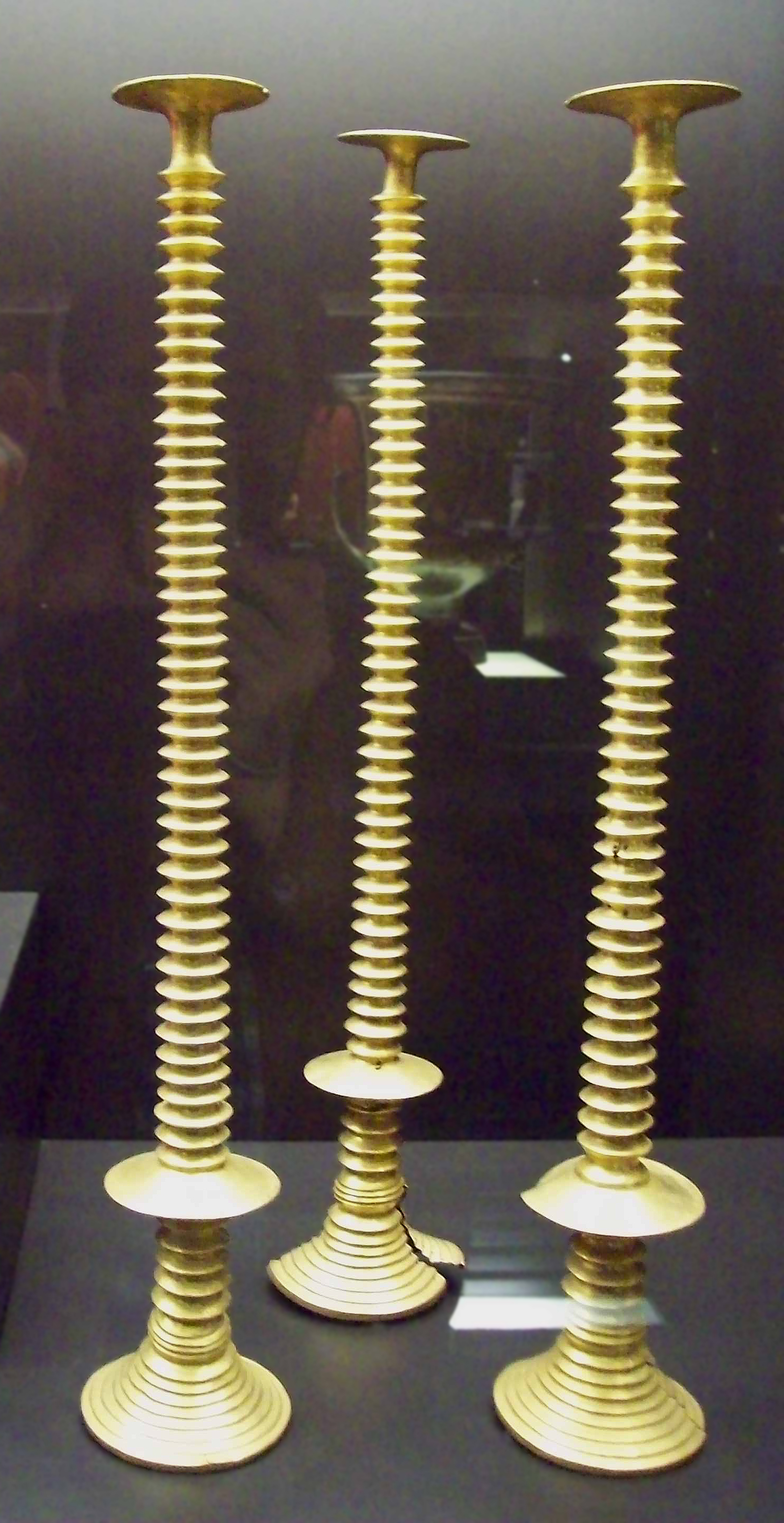
Candelabra of Lebrija, found in Lebrija

The emergence of new archaeological finds in the city of Huelva is prompting the revision of these traditional views. Just in two adjacent lots adding up to 2,150 sq. m. between Las Monjas Square and Mendez Nuñez Street, some 90,000 ceramic fragments of indigenous, Phoenician, and Greek imported wares were exhumed, out of which 8,009 allowed scope for a type identification. This pottery, dated from the 10th to the early 8th centuries BC, predates finds from other Phoenician colonies; together with remnants of numerous activities, the Huelva discoveries reveal a substantial industrial and commercial emporion on this site lasting several centuries. Similar finds in other parts of the city make it possible to estimate the protohistoric habitat of Huelva at some 20 hectares, large for a site in the Iberian Peninsula during that period.

=== Carbon dating ===
Calibrated carbon-14 dating carried out by the University of Groningen on associated cattle bones as well as dating based on ceramic samples permit a chronology of several centuries through the state of the art of craft and industry since the 10th century BC, as follows: pottery (bowls, plates, craters, vases, amphorae, etc.), melting pots, casting nozzles, weights, finely worked pieces of wood, ship parts, bovid skulls, pendants, fibulae, anklebones, agate, ivory (with the only workshop of the period so far proven in the west), gold, silver, etc.

The existence of foreign produce and materials together with local ones suggests that the old Huelva harbor was a major hub for the reception, manufacturing, and shipping of diverse products of different and distant origin. The analysis of written sources and the products exhumed, including inscriptions and thousands of Greek ceramics, some of which are works of excellent quality by known potters and painters, has led some scholars to suggest that this habitat can be identified not only with the place name Tarshish, which is mentioned in the Bible, in the Assyrian stele of Esarhaddon, and perhaps in the Phoenician inscription of the Nora Stone, but also with the Tartessos of Greek sources (interpreting the Tartessus river as equivalent to the present-day Rio Tinto and the Ligustine Lake as the joint estuary of the Odiel and Tinto rivers flowing west and east of the Huelva Peninsula. Most Tartessian sites were inexplicably abandoned in the 5th century BC.

== Religion ==
There are very little data but it is assumed that as with other Mediterranean peoples, the Tartessian religion was polytheistic. It is believed that Tartessians worshipped the goddess Astarte or Potnia and the masculine divinity Baal or Melkart, as a result of the Phoenician acculturation. Sanctuaries inspired by Phoenician architecture have been found in the deposit of Castulo (Linares, Jaén) and in the vicinity of Carmona. Several images of Phoenician deities have been found in Cádiz, Huelva, and Sevilla.

== Language ==
Iberia circa 300 BC, before the Carthaginian conquest; the residual Tartessian language is depicted in the southwest

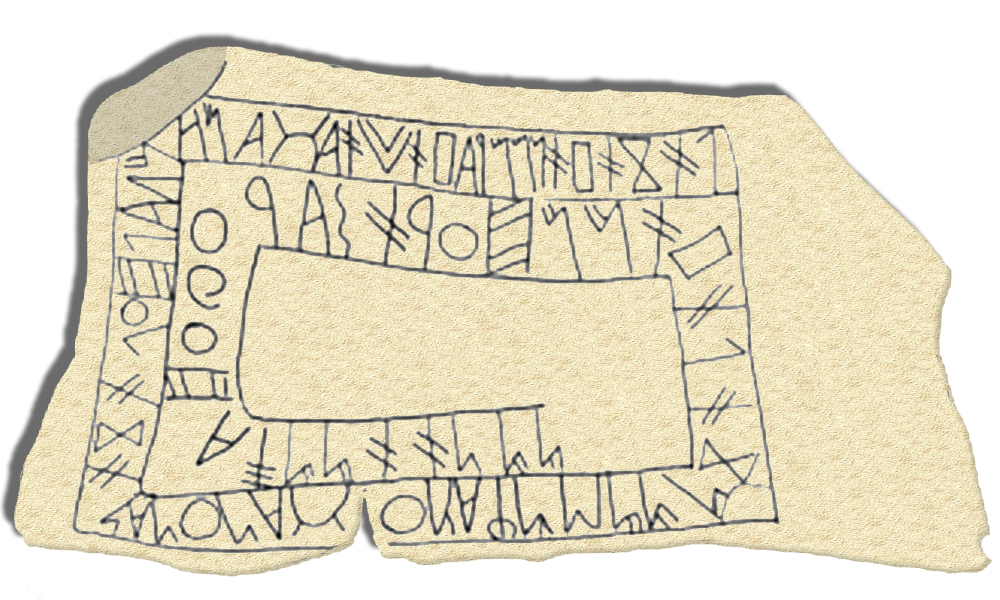
The Tartessian Fonte Velha inscription found in Bensafrim, Lagos, southern Portugal

The Tartessian language is an extinct pre-Roman language once spoken in southern Iberia. The oldest known indigenous texts of Iberia, dated from the 7th to 6th centuries BC, are written in Tartessian. The inscriptions are written in a semi-syllabic writing system called the Southwest script; they were found in the general area in which Tartessos was located and in surrounding areas of influence. Tartessian-language texts have been found in Southwestern Spain and southern Portugal (namely in the Conii, Cempsi, Sefes, and Celtici areas of the Algarve and southern Alentejo).

== Possible identification as Tarshish or Atlantis ==
Since the classicists of the early 20th century, biblical archaeologists have often identified the place name Tarshish, mentioned in the Hebrew Bible, with Tartessos, although others have instead connected Tarshish to Tarsus in Anatolia or other places as far as India. Tarshish, like Tartessos, is associated with extensive mineral wealth (Iberian Pyrite Belt).

In 1922, Adolf Schulten claimed that Tartessos was the Western, and wholly European, source of the legend of Atlantis.

In 2011 a team led by Richard Freund said it had found strong evidence for the location in Doñana National Park based on underground and underwater surveys and the interpretation of the archaeological site Cancho Roano as "memorial cities" rebuilt in the image of Atlantis. Spanish scientists said Freund was sensationalising their work. The anthropologist Juan Villarías-Robles, who works with the Spanish National Research Council, said "Richard Freund was a newcomer to our project and appeared to be involved in his own very controversial issue concerning King Solomon's search for ivory and gold in Tartessos, the well-documented settlement in the Doñana area established in the first millennium BC" and described his claims as "fanciful".

== See also ==
- Colaeus
- Atlantic Bronze Age
- Prehistoric Iberia
- Turdetani
- Pre-Roman peoples of the Iberian Peninsula

== Sources ==
- Jaime Alvar & José María Blázquez, eds. (1993). Los enigmas de Tartessos. Madrid: Catedra. - Papers following a 1991 conference.
- José María Blázquez (1975). Tartessos y los orígenes de la colonización fenicia en Occidente, 2nd edn. Salamanca: University of Salamanca. - Assemblies of Punic materials found in Spain.
- José Chocomeli (1940). En busca de Tartessos. Valencia: La semana grafica.
- Fernando González de Canales Cerisola (2014). Del Occidente mítico griego a Tarsis-Tarteso – Fuentes escritas y documentación arqueológica. Madrid: Biblioteca Nueva.
- Fernando González de Canales Cerisola, Jorge Llompart Gómez, & Leonardo Serrano Pichardo (2004). El emporio fenicio precolonial de Huelva, ca. 900-770 a.C.. Madrid: Biblioteca Nueva.
- Sebastián Celestino Pérez & Carolina López-Ruiz (2016). Tartessos and the Phoenicians in Iberia. NY: Oxford University Press, 2016.
