= La Serena, Spain =

La Serena
- Comarca
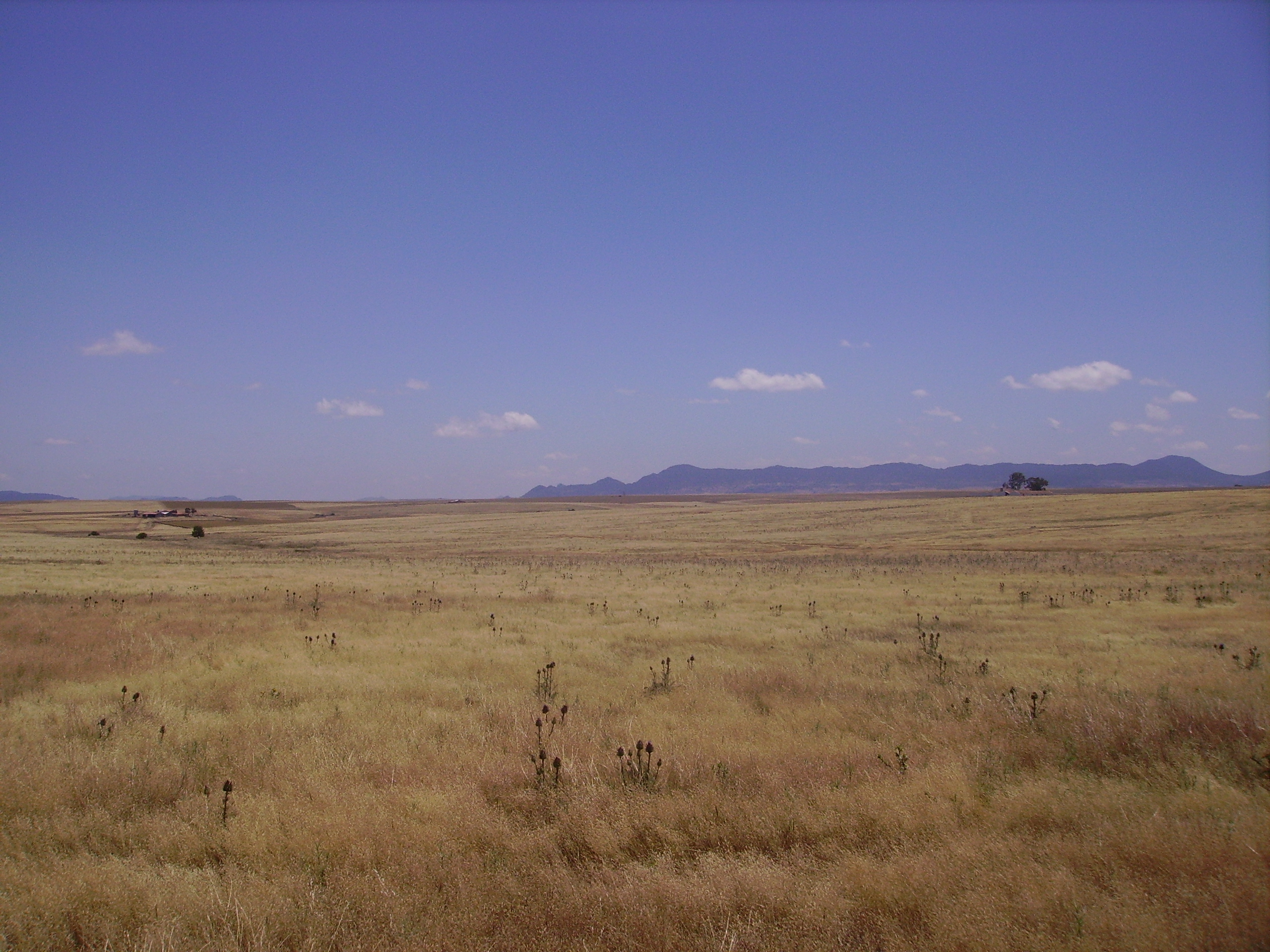

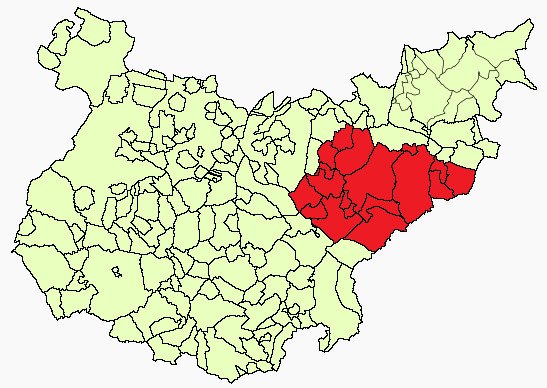
- Location of the comarca in the province of Badajoz
- Coordinates: 38°43′N 5°33′W
- Country: Spain
- Autonomous community: Extremadura
- Province: Badajoz
- Capital: Castuera

Area
  - Total: 2,654 km^{2} (1,025 sq mi)

Population
  - Total: 39,333
  - Density: 14.82/km^{2} (38.38/sq mi)
- Time zone: UTC+1 (CET)
  - Summer (DST): UTC+2 (CEST)

La Serena [la seˈɾena] is a comarca located in the east of the province of Badajoz, Extremadura, Spain. The main town is Castuera.

It is a comarca based on a natural region which includes plains, as well as some low ranges of the Sierra Morena. The climate is continental, with strong fluctuations.

The area's pastures are grazed by merino sheep, which are raised for wool and for milk used to make La Serena cheese, a product with a protected product by its origin status.

The population of the territory is around 39,000 inhabitants.

== Municipalities ==
The comarca contains the following municipalities:

- Benquerencia de la Serena
- Campanario
- Capilla
- Castuera
- Cabeza del Buey
- Esparragosa de la Serena
- Higuera de la Serena
- La Coronada
- La Haba
- Magacela
- Malpartida de la Serena
- Monterrubio de la Serena
- Orellana la Vieja
- Peñalsordo
- Quintana de la Serena
- Valle de la Serena
- Villanueva de la Serena
- Zalamea de la Serena
- Zarza-Capilla
