= Carpia =

Iberian city

Carpia (Ancient Greek: Καρπία) was an Iberian city which is said to be the site of the ancient city Tartessos, which disappeared around 600 BCE, or the refoundation of the sunken city.

== History ==
Pausanias, a Greek traveler and geographer of the 2nd century CE, wrote of a connection between Tartessos and Carpia after visiting Elis:

"They say that Tartessus is a river in the land of the Iberians, running down into the sea by two mouths, and that between these two mouths lies a city of the same name. The river, which is the largest in Iberia, and tidal, those of a later day called Baetis, and there are some who think that Tartessus was the ancient name of Carpia, a city of the Iberians."

== See also ==
- Arganthonios
- Tartessian language
