= Capilla, Badajoz =

Capilla
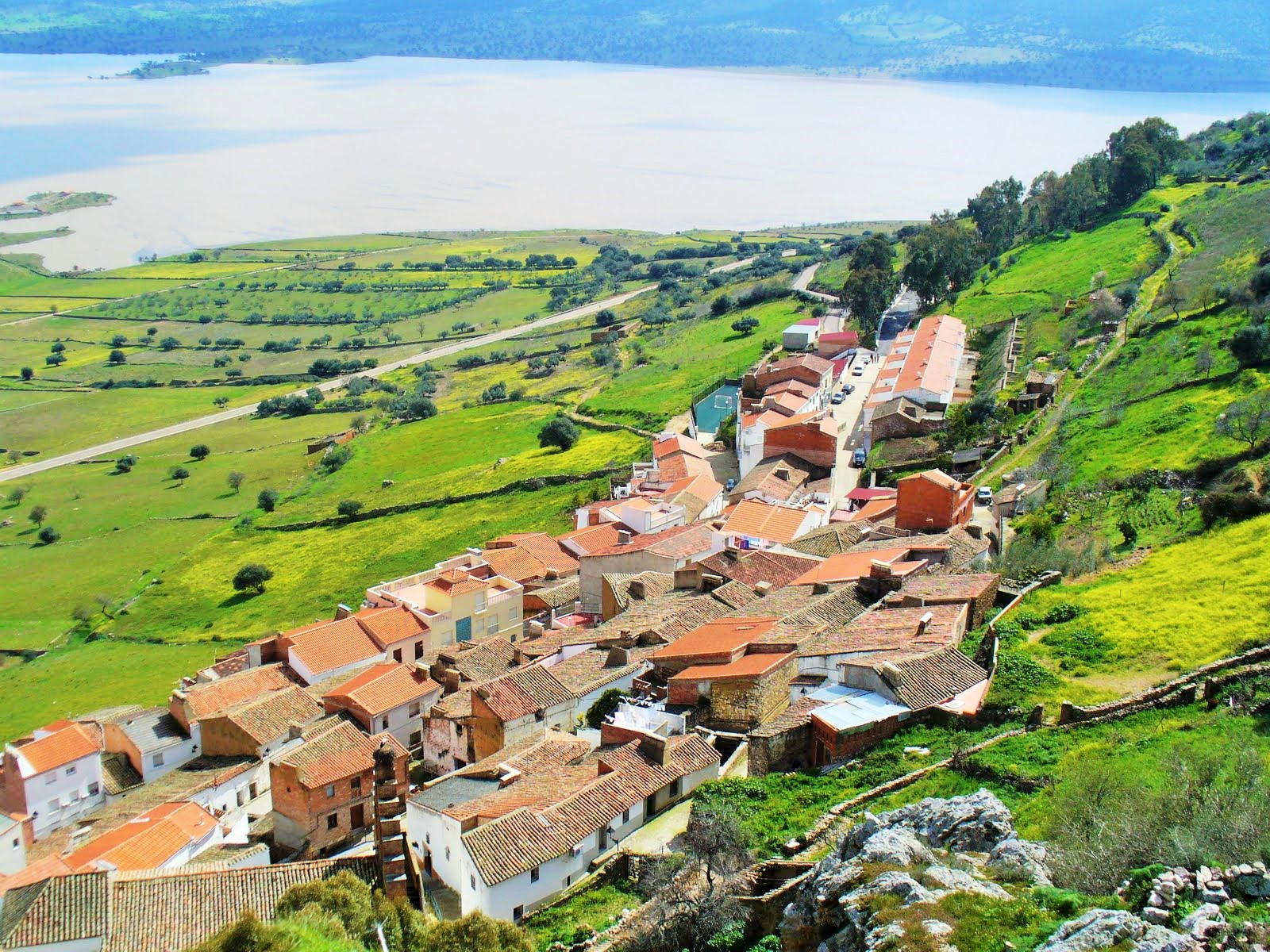

- Location of Capilla within Extremadura
- Coordinates: 38°49′00″N 5°4′59″W
- Country: Spain
- Autonomous community: Extremadura
- Province: Badajoz
- Comarca: La Serena

Government
  - Alcalde: Antonio Gil García

Area
  - Total: 147 km^{2} (57 sq mi)
- Elevation: 558 m (1,831 ft)

Population (2025-01-01)
  - Total: 142
- Time zone: UTC+1 (CET)
  - Summer (DST): UTC+2 (CEST)
- Website: Ayuntamiento de Capilla

Capilla is a Spanish municipality in the province of Badajoz, Extremadura. It has a population of 189 (2007) and an area of 147 km^{2}.

== See also ==
- List of municipalities in Badajoz
