= La Serena cheese =

Merino sheep's milk cheese

Queso de La Serena
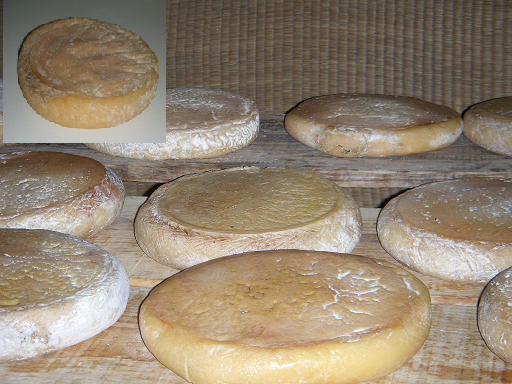
- Country of origin: Spain
- Region: Extremadura
- Town: La Serena
- Source of milk: sheep
- Texture: Soft
- Aging time: >60 days
- Named after: La Serena

Queso de La Serena is a cheese made from Merino sheep milk in the comarca (district) of La Serena, in Extremadura, Spain. The pure sheep milk is curdled using a coagulant found in the pistils of cardoon (Cynara cardunculus). This ingredient lends a light bitterness to the otherwise slightly salty taste. It is aged for at least sixty days. When the cheese has a creamy consistency in the centre, it is traditionally eaten by slicing off the top and scooping out the inside with a spoon, and it is known as Torta de La Serena. If it is allowed to mature further it becomes harder, develops a stronger taste and is known as Queso de La Serena.

The cheese weighs between 250 grams and 3 kilograms, with a height of 40% to 70% of the diameter and a minimum diameter of 8 cm. The Torta de La Serena is a PDO (Protected Designation of Origin) cheese and must be made using only natural whole milk from healthy Merino sheep raised in the region, without colostrum or preservatives.

Torta de La Serena differs from the Torta del Casar, which is also made in Extremadura, because it is made only from Merino sheep milk, whereas Torta del Casar is made from milk from mixed breeds; and also because less rennet (coagulant) is used. These two conditions result in a milder cheese. It differs from Queijo Serra da Estrela, made in neighbouring Portugal, because, although Queijo Serra da Estrela is, like Torta de La Serena, made entirely from Merino sheep milk, is uses more rennet (more even than Torta del Casar). This results in Queijo Serra da Estrela having a stronger, more bitter taste.

The Torta de La Serena is a PDO.
