= Cortijo Jurado =

19th century mansion in Málaga, Spain

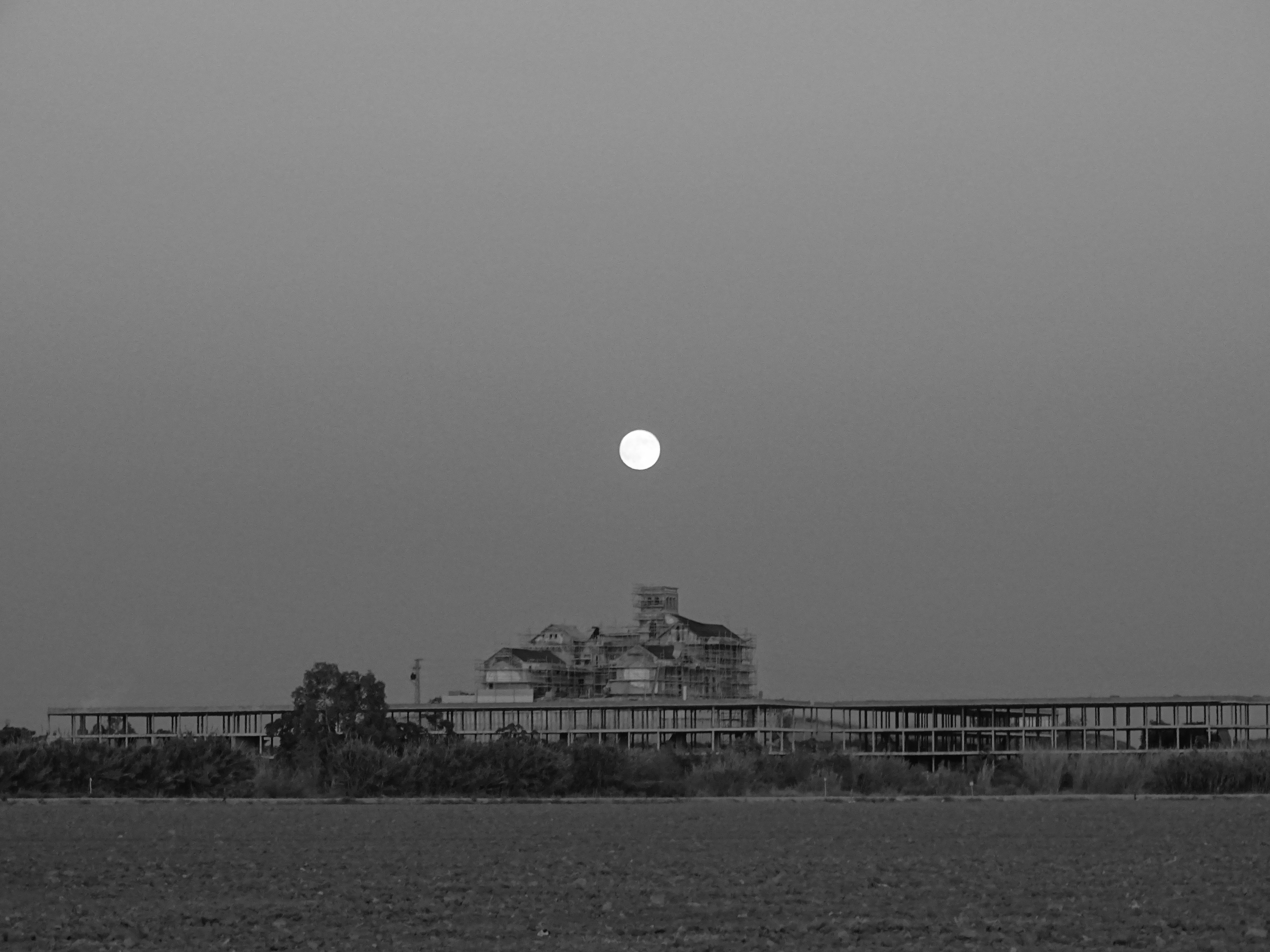
Full moon over the Cortijo Jurado

The Cortijo Jurado, or Casa Encantada as it is known, is a 19th-century mansion that lies in ruins just off the A-357 near Campanillas Village in Málaga Province (Spain). It enjoys the reputation as being one of the most haunted houses in the Province. The 45,206 square metres of land that makes up the Cortijo estate is estimated to be worth almost 1.4 million euros.

== History ==
The mansion was built in the 19th century by the influential Heredia family from Málaga, one of Andalucia’s wealthiest families at the time. The building boasts 365 windows, one for each day of the year and was constructed as a cortijo as part of a plan to convert the farm into a grand agricultural enterprise. In 1925, the property passed to its new owners, the Jurado family.

It is known in Málaga as ‘the haunted mansion’, not only for its ghostly appearance, but due to numerous reports of mysterious voices and strange sounds that have been reportedly heard there without explanation. It is among the best known ‘haunted’ buildings in Spain and is considered a sort of temple by followers of paranormal phenomena.

Legend has it that the Heredia family, together with other rich families in the area, kidnapped young girls, aged between 18 and 21, and subjected them to sinister satanic rituals, involving torture and murder. The bodies of their victims are said to be buried deep within the property. Whilst it is true that many young girls did disappear during this period, nothing was ever proven to connect their disappearance to the Heredia family. Many say they used their money and influence to evade justice. Whatever the truth of the matter, paranormal enthusiasts maintain that the pain and suffering that took place within those grim walls has led to inexplicable ghostly phenomena.

== Recent history ==
In 2002, Málaga Council approved a proposal submitted by the Mirador group to build a four-star hotel complex in the grounds of the Cortijo Jurado and to renovate the original building to provide a cultural edifice, open to the public.

In December, 2004, the construction licence was issued and a high-profile event was arranged, during which Málaga's Mayor, Francisco de la Torre, laid the symbolic foundation stone to inaugurate the commencement of the project. Four years later, not a single brick has been laid. Since then, the Mirador group has faced a number of lawsuits from clients to whom they sold properties which were never built.

The courts froze the lands of the Cortijo to protect debts of over five million euros, most of which is owed to Promociones Pantie, from whom Mirador secured the mortgage for this property. Málaga Council is also owed 365,000 euros by the Mirador group. Málaga Council then contentiously extended the building licence for the original project when it expired in December 2008.

In February 2009, opposition councillor, Antonio Serrano, of the ‘United Left’, lodged an official complaint accusing the town hall of bribery and abuse of power in relation to their dealings with the Mirador group. One of the main issues raised by Serrano was that the town hall had waived the obligatory ten per cent fee for the building licence, which in this case was 900,000 euros. The town hall defended its position by claiming that the regulations had not come into force at the time the agreement was signed.

In May 2009 a Málaga judge ordered the troubled property group, Mirador, who own the property to sell it by public auction, on May 11, at the behest of one of the group's principal creditors, Promociones Pantie. The auction did not go through due to an administrative error.
