= Cancho Roano =

Cultural property in Badajoz, Spain

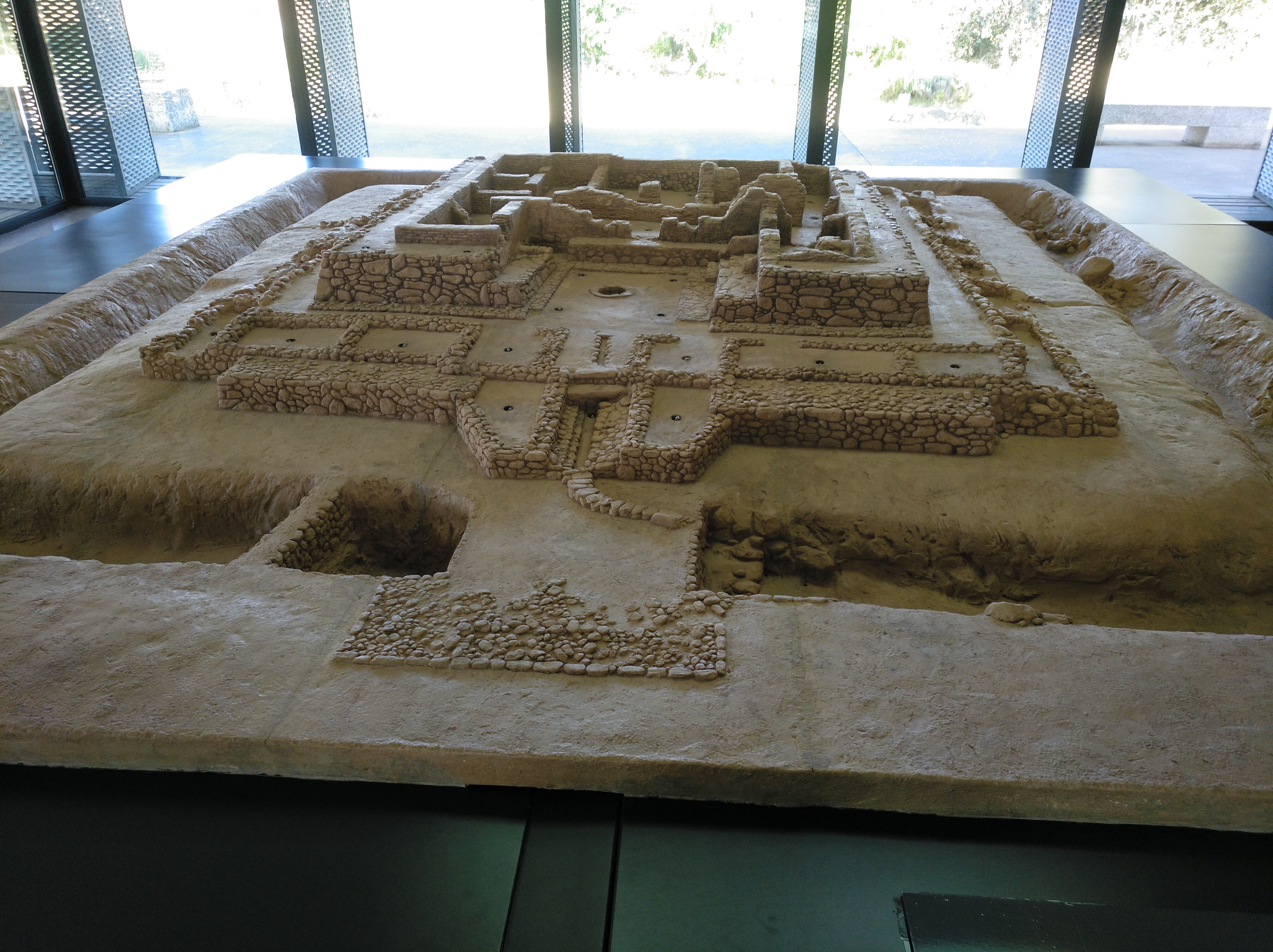
- Model of Cancho Roano
- Interactive map of Cancho Roano
- 38.7011°N 5.6860°W
- Type: Uncertain
- Periods: Late Bronze Age
- Cultures: Tartessian
- Location: Zalamea de la Serena, Badajoz, Extremadura, Spain
- Region: Iberian Peninsula

History
- Built: 6th century BCE
- Abandoned: before 370 BCE

Site notes
- Excavation dates: 1978 - 2001
- Archaeologists: Juan Maluquer de Motes
- Discovered: 1978
- Owner: Extremadura Identity Museums Network
- Public access: Yes

Spanish Cultural Heritage
- Type: Zona arqueológica
- Designated: February 10, 1989
- Reference no.: RI-55-0000239

Cancho Roano (sometimes Cancho Ruano) is an archaeological site located in the municipality of Zalamea de la Serena, in the province of Badajoz, Spain. It is located three miles from Zalamea de la Serena in the direction of Quintana de la Serena Quintana, in a small valley along the stream Cagancha.

== History ==
Cancho Roano is the best preserved Tartessian site. It dates back to at least the sixth century BCE, although the building was expanded and modified in later centuries. Based on the dating of objects found on the site, Cancho Roano is estimated to date from 550 BCE. The site was destroyed in a fire no later than 370 BCE. The building appears to have been ritually burned and sealed in rammed earth in a manner similar to Etruscan. The main body of the building is square and oriented toward the east. The building is surrounded by a deep moat, which was permanently filled with water. Although Cancho Roano's exact function is unknown, the religious character of the site is undeniable due to the presence of altars; however, the site may be a palace-shrine, judging from its defensive system.

== Discovery and excavations ==
Excavations of the site, directed by John Maluquer de Motes, began in 1978 and continued through 2001. It was declared a National Monument in 1986. The site, along with an interpretation center, is open to the public.

== Interpretations ==
The evident sacred character of the building and the presence of multiple cells have attracted the idea of a temple dedicated to sacred prostitution, possibly dedicated to the Phoenician deity Astarte. The hypothesis is supported by the presence of looms in two of the chambers, evoking the weavers of the goddess Asherah who worked as prostitutes in the ancient Temple of Jerusalem. Similar rites would have been identified on the iconography of other Phoenician sites in Hispania, like Gadir, Castulo and La Quéjola (Albacete). Another possibility would be a palace meant to accommodate a harem, whose members would likely act in sacred rites on the temple.

Richard Freund theorizes that Cancho Roano was a "memorial city" designed to serve as a ceremonial representation of the lost city of Tartessos, which, in Freund's theory, was also Atlantis. Freund argued that a stele found at Cancho Roano displayed an image with concentric circles that matches Plato's description of Atlantis. Nonetheless, Freund's theories have been widely dismissed in academic circles, and the symbol is not much more than a typical warrior shield engraved in the Southwestern Stelae from the Iberian Peninsula, of which there are many examples.

== See also ==
- Turuñuelo
