= Malpartida de la Serena =

- Municipality
- Coat of arms

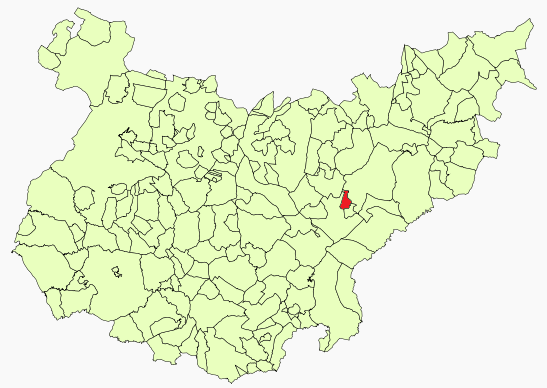
- Location in Badajoz

- Location of Malpartida de la Serena within Extremadura
- Coordinates: 38°40′28″N 5°38′24″W
- Country: Spain
- Autonomous community: Extremadura
- Province: Badajoz
- Comarca: La Serena

Government
  - Alcalde: Pedro Gómez Gallego

Area
  - Total: 26.3 km^{2} (10.2 sq mi)
- Elevation: 479 m (1,572 ft)

Population (2025-01-01)
  - Total: 508
  - Density: 19.3/km^{2} (50.0/sq mi)
- Time zone: UTC+1 (CET)
  - Summer (DST): UTC+2 (CEST)

Malpartida de la Serena is a municipality in the province of Badajoz, Extremadura, Spain. According to the 2014 census, the municipality has a population of 610 inhabitants.

== See also ==
- La Serena
- List of municipalities in Badajoz
