= Benquerencia de la Serena =

- Municipality
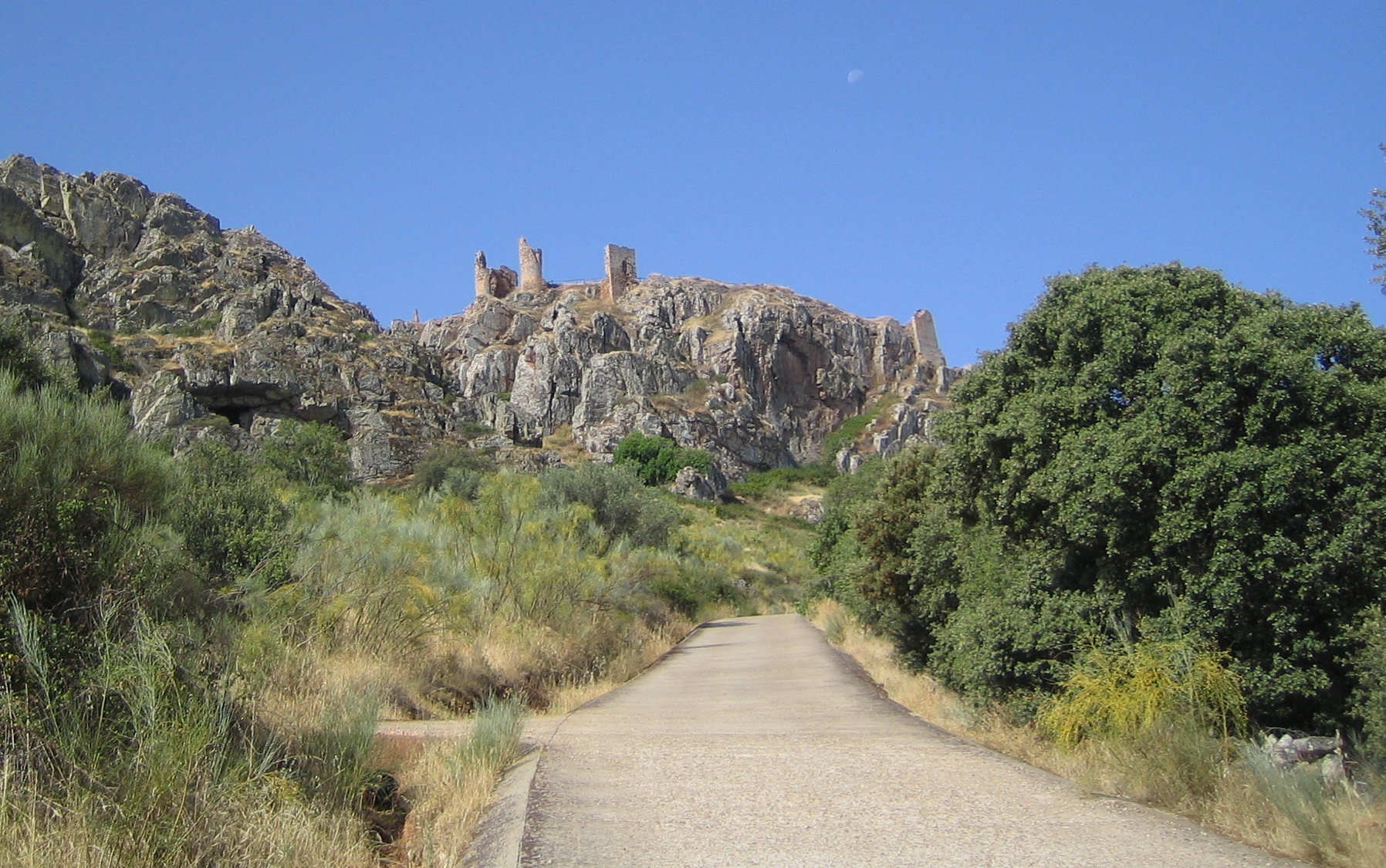
- Benquerencia castle

- Coat of arms

- Location of Benquerencia de la Serena within Extremadura Benquerencia de la Serena (Spain)
- Coordinates: 38°41′58″N 5°29′40″W
- Country: Spain
- Autonomous community: Extremadura
- Province: Badajoz
- Comarca: La Serena

Area
  - Total: 102.8 km^{2} (39.7 sq mi)
- Elevation (AMSL): 672 m (2,205 ft)

Population (2025-01-01)
  - Total: 771
  - Density: 7.50/km^{2} (19.4/sq mi)
- Time zone: UTC+1 (CET)
  - Summer (DST): UTC+2 (CEST (GMT +2))
- Postal code: 06429
- Area code: +34 (Spain) + 924 (Badajoz)

Benquerencia de la Serena (Spanish pronunciation: [beŋ.keˈɾen.θja ðe la seˈɾe.na]) is a municipality in the province of Badajoz, Extremadura, Spain. According to the 2014 census, the municipality has a population of 904 inhabitants. It is located in La Serena comarca, in the area of the Sierra Morena, the local ranges being Sierra de Benquerencia, Sierra de los Tiros and Sierra de Almorchón.

== Villages ==
- Benquerencia de la Serena
- Helechal, site of the cortijo del Enjembraero where four political prisoners: Sinesio Calderón, Antonio Cortés, Antonio Iglesias and Manuel Merinot were executed extrajudicially on 1 February 1949 accused of assisting the Spanish Maquis by the Francoist authorities.
- La Nava
- Puerto Hurraco
- Puerto Mejoral

== See also ==
- Puerto Hurraco massacre
- List of municipalities in Badajoz
