= Monterrubio de la Serena =

- Municipality
- Coat of arms

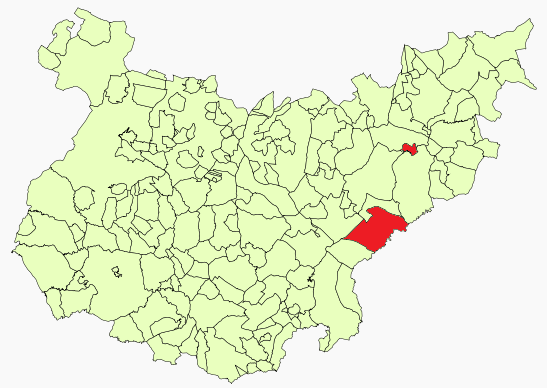
- Location in Badajoz

- Location of within Extremadura
- Coordinates: 38°35′24″N 5°26′36″W
- Country: Spain
- Autonomous community: Extremadura
- Province: Badajoz
- Comarca: La Serena

Government
  - Alcalde: Jesús Martín Torres

Area
  - Total: 314.9 km^{2} (121.6 sq mi)
- Elevation: 557 m (1,827 ft)

Population (2025-01-01)
  - Total: 2,157
  - Density: 6.850/km^{2} (17.74/sq mi)
- Time zone: UTC+1 (CET)
  - Summer (DST): UTC+2 (CEST)

Monterrubio de la Serena is a municipality in the province of Badajoz, Extremadura, Spain. According to the 2014 census, the municipality has a population of 2537 inhabitants.

== See also ==
- La Serena
- List of municipalities in Badajoz
