= Castuera =

- Municipality
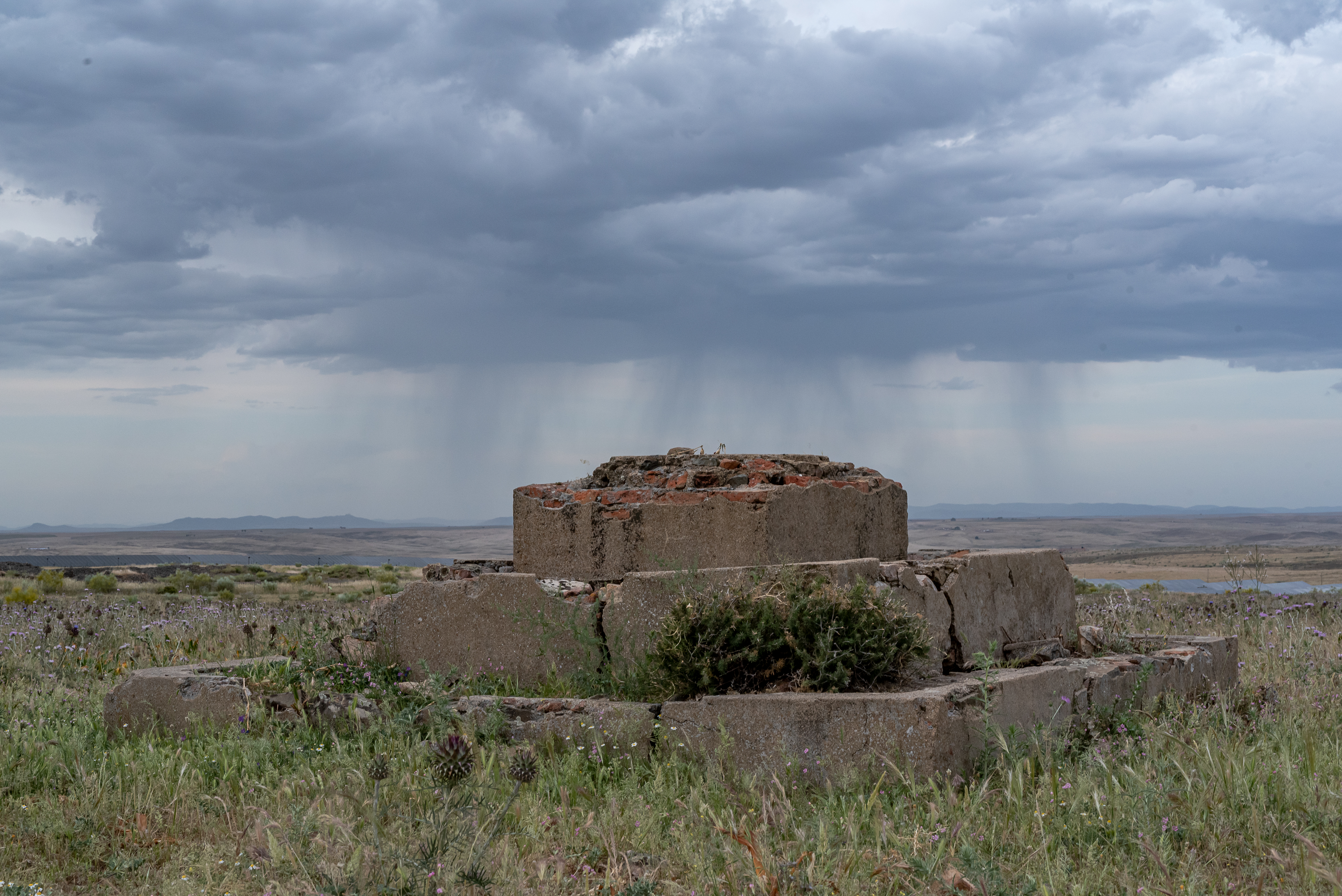
- Remains of the cross that presided over the entrance to the Castuera concentration camp

- Coat of arms

- Location of Castuera within Extremadura
- Coordinates: 38°43′23″N 5°32′40″W
- Country: Spain
- Autonomous Community: Extremadura
- Province: Badajoz
- Comarca: La Serena

Area
  - Total: 432 km^{2} (167 sq mi)
- Elevation (AMSL): 512 m (1,680 ft)

Population (2025-01-01)
  - Total: 5,457
  - Density: 12.6/km^{2} (32.7/sq mi)
- Time zone: UTC+1 (CET)
  - Summer (DST): UTC+2 (CEST (GMT +2))
- Postal code: 06420
- Area code: +34 (Spain) + 924 (Badajoz)
- Website: www.castuera.es

Castuera is a municipality in the province of Badajoz, Extremadura, Spain. According to the 2014 census, the municipality has a population of 6,255 inhabitants.

== Notable people ==
- Maria Dolores Aguilar

== See also ==
- List of municipalities in Badajoz
