= Cortijo de Miraflores =

Historical building in Marbella, Spain

Coordinates: 36.51599°N 4.88904°W

Cortijo de Miraflores is a historical building in the Pilar Miraflores neighborhood of Marbella, Spain.

It originated in the cortijo built in 1706 by Tomás Francisco Domínguez y Godoy on the ruins of a former farming estate.

The building houses a number of decorative elements, probably from earlier buildings, such as medallions.
