= Zalamea de la Serena =

- Municipality
- Coat of arms

- Location in Spain
- Coordinates: 38°38′59″N 5°39′25″W
- Country: Spain
- Autonomous Community: Extremadura
- Province: Badajoz
- Comarca: La Serena

Government
  - Mayor: José Antonio Murillo Dávila (PP)

Area
  - Total: 246 km^{2} (95 sq mi)
- Elevation (AMSL): 485 m (1,591 ft)

Population (2025-01-01)
  - Total: 3,371
  - Density: 13.7/km^{2} (35.5/sq mi)
- Time zone: UTC+1 (CET)
  - Summer (DST): UTC+2 (CEST (GMT +2))
- Postal code: 06430
- Area code: +34 (Spain) + 924 (Badajoz)
- Website: www.zalamea.com

Zalamea de la Serena is a municipality in the province of Badajoz, Extremadura, Spain. According to the 2025 census, the municipality has a population of 3371 inhabitants.

Zalamea is the setting of the play, "El Alcalde de Zalamea," or the "Mayor of Zalamea."

Monuments include: the dystile, and church called ´El Cristo.´ There is a small village called Docenario close to Zalamea.

Monuments There is a Dystile from Roman times. There is a castle and it is about 2,400 years old. There are two churches from Roman times.

Nine km to the north is Cancho Roano, a temple/ritual site of the Tartessian period, now with a Visitor centre

Other buildings and facilities in Zalamea There is a football field. There are some sport centres. There are some street lights.

There is a castle. It is big and the color brown. The castle has got two towers.

Festivals and Celebrations

There are festivals. There is a festival called ´Romeria. There is a festival called ´San Cristobal and it is celebrated in the ´Charca.´ ´Charca´ is a big lake with fishing lines.

== See also ==
- La Serena
- List of municipalities in Badajoz
