= Auguste-Émile Pinchart =

French painter and designer

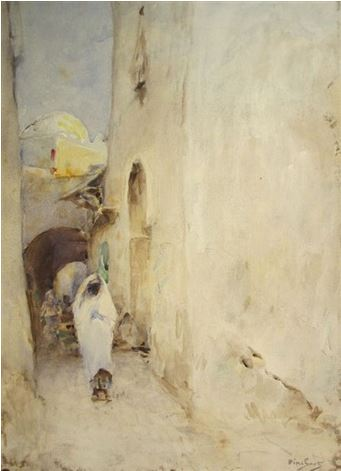
Stroller on a Street in Tunis

Auguste-Émile Pinchart, or Émile-Auguste Pinchart (10 August 1842, Cambrai - November 1920, Tunis) was a French painter and designer who is best remembered for his Orientalist scenes.

== Biography ==
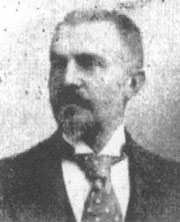
Pinchart (date unknown)

He began as a student in the workshops of Jean-Léon Gérôme, then signed a contract with the art dealers, Goupil & Cie, to produce drawings for reproduction as prints, creating genre scenes of everyday life that proved to be quite popular. His first exhibit at the Salon came in 1864.

During the Paris Commune, he became friends with the writer, Émile Bergerat, who recalls in his memoirs that Pinchart occasionally worked as a butcher, to help his fellow artists survive the siege. Through Bergerat, he became involved in the cultural circle associated with the dancer, Carlotta Grisi, and would marry Léontine-Ernestine, her daughter from an affair with Prince Leon Hieronim Radziwiłł.

After that, they divided their time between Paris and Geneva, where they lived in a home owned by his mother-in-law. There, he would produce posters, lithographs and prints, which he published under his company name, the "Atelier Pinchart". He also illustrated the Nouvelles Orientales of Émile Julliard (1837-?), published in 1891 by Alioth. In 1895, he won a contest for the official poster of the Schweizerische Landesausstellung, which was to be held in Geneva in 1896.

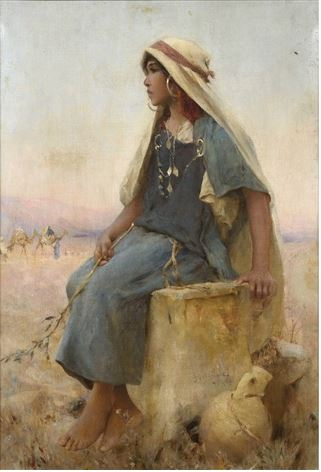
Young Tunisian, Seated

In 1883, he won an honorable mention at the Salon, then a third-class medal the following year. He continued to exhibit there until 1893. Ten years later, he was elected a member of the Société des Artistes Français. The gallery of Bernheim-Jeune became his representatives.

In 1901, he settled in Tunis and opened a new Atelier Pinchart, not far from the French Embassy and the central market. There, he specialized in portraits of the local people and landscapes of the surrounding areas. He also trained several local artists; notably Hédi Khayachi.

His works from there were used as illustrations in a number of periodicals; including Le Figaro and Paris-Noël.
