= Hélène Benichou-Safar =

French historian, archaeologist, epigraphist and Semiticist

Hélène Bénichou-Safar
- Education: Doctorate in Archaeology (1978)
- Occupations: Historian, archaeologist, epigraphist, Semiticist
- Known for: Research on Phoenician-Punic civilization and religion
- Awards: Prix Hippone (1978)

Hélène Bénichou-Safar is a French historian, archaeologist, epigraphist and Semiticist. She received her Doctorate degree in Archaeology in 1978; her work focuses on Phoenician-Punic civilization and religion. In 1978, she was awarded the Prix Hippone for her thesis on the Punic tombs of Carthage, published in Paris in 1982.

== Publications ==
- Hélène Bénichou-Safar; Jean Bussière; Fethi Chelbi; Paul Corbier; Naïdé Ferchiou; Jacques Gascou; Gilbert Hallier; Roland Paskoff; Pol Trousset (1995). Antiquités africaines. CNRS Éditions. p. 356. ISBN 978-2271053596..
- Hélène Bénichou-Safar (1998). Tombes Puniques de Carthage. CNRS Éditions. p. 437. ISBN 978-2222029144..
- Hélène Bénichou-Safar (2004). Le Tophet de Salammbô à Carthage. éditions École française de Rome. p. 217. ISBN 978-2728306978..
