= Diocesan Library of Tunis =

Library in Tunis, Tunisia

Coordinates: 36.7987°N 10.1731°E

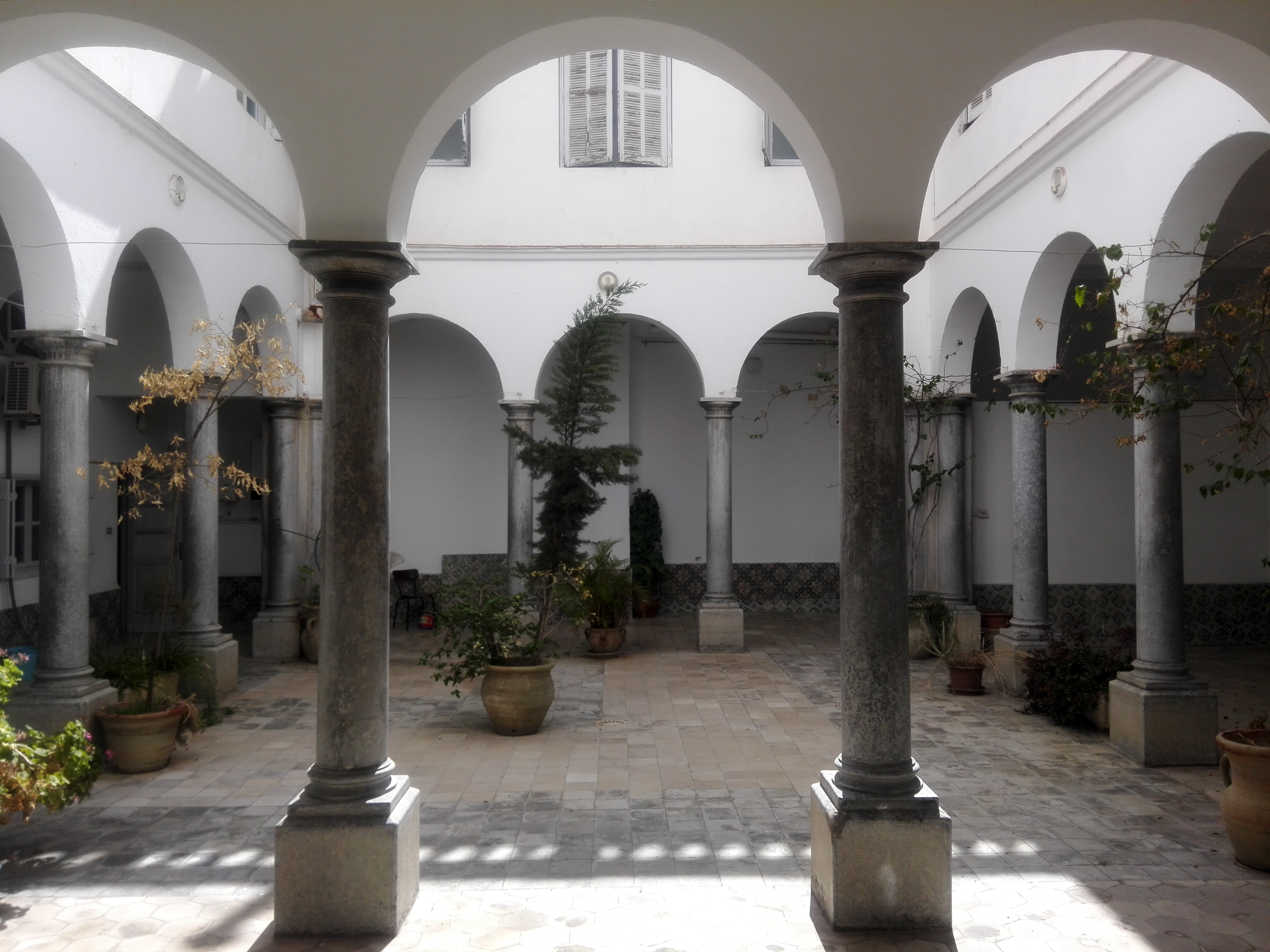
- Courtyard of the library
- Location: Tunisia
- Established: 2001

Collection
- Items collected: Religious science Social science Tunis culture
- Size: 50,000

The Diocesan Library of Tunis (Arabic: المكتبة الأسقفية بتونس) is a library located in Tunis. It is operated by the Archdiocese of Tunis and specializes in religious science, focused on facilitating dialogue between religions and cultures.

== Location ==
The library is located on Sidi Saber (Arabic: سيدي صابر) Street, where it occupies the basement of former Catholic school once operated by the Sisters of St. Joseph of the Apparition.

== History ==
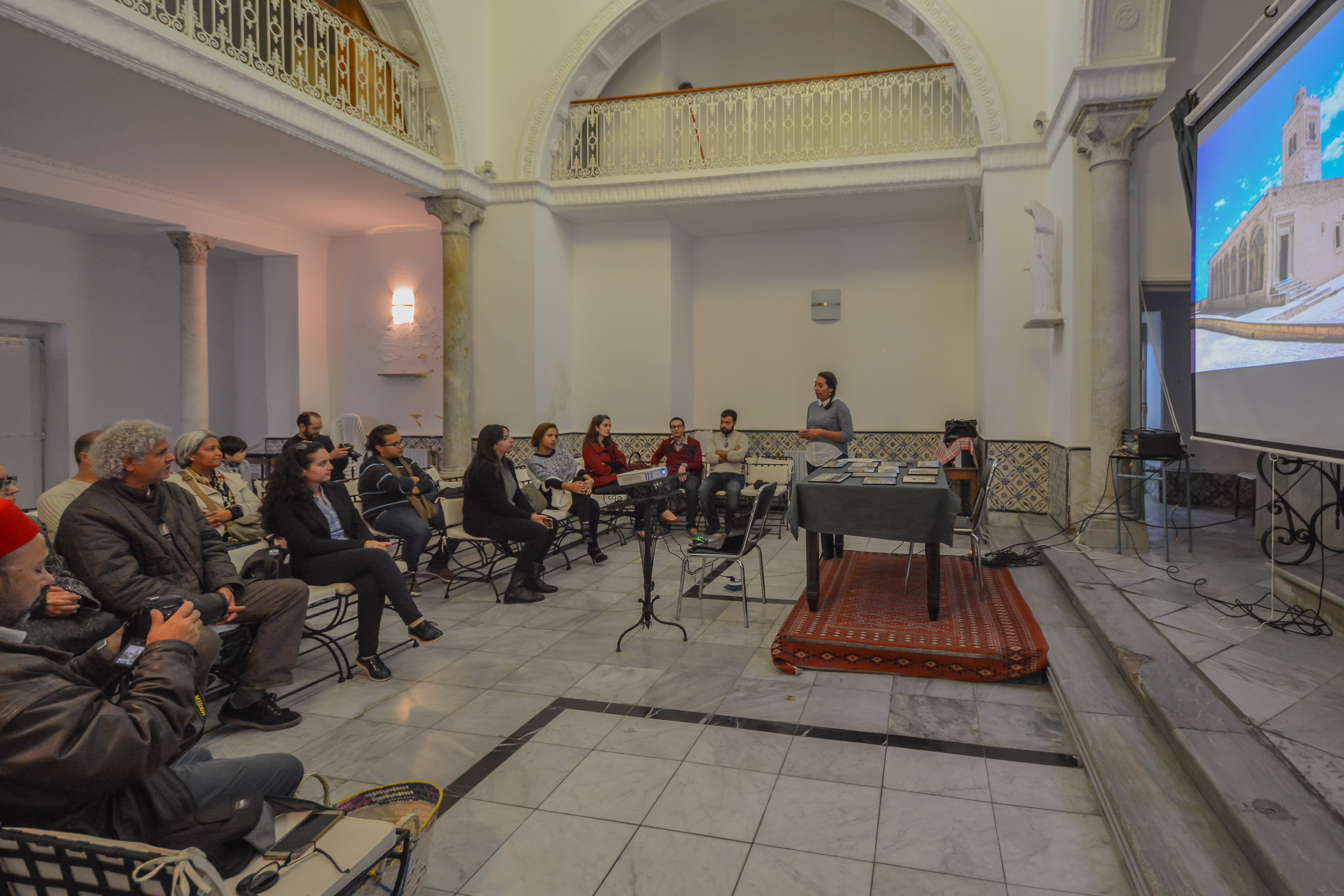
Wiki Loves Monuments awards ceremony 2016, held at the library.

After the closure of the Sisters of St. Joseph of the Apparition's school in 1999, the Archbishop of Tunis Fouad Twal entrusted father Francisco Donayre with the project of creating the library. After restoring the building, the library opened in January 2001.

== Collection ==
The library has over 50,000 volumes focused on comparative religion, Tunisian culture and the social sciences, from antiquity to present day.

The collection includes books from a former Major Seminary of Tunis, which closed in 1964, and the collection of an abbot Jean-Marie Guillemaud.

The library contains books in Arabic, several European languages, and ancient languages such as Greek, Latin, and Hebrew. There is also a collection of French classical literature.

== Associations and partnerships ==
A French organization called Partnership Between Mediterranean Cultures, located in Aurillac, France, supports the library. The Tunisian Association of Cartagena cooperates regularly with the library to organize various social and cultural activities, and it has permanent contact with the Carthage Studies Center and the Institute of Arab Literature in Tunis.
