= Ilario Antoniazzi =

Catholic archbishop (born 1948)

The Most Reverend Ilario Antoniazzi
- Archbishop emeritus of Tunis
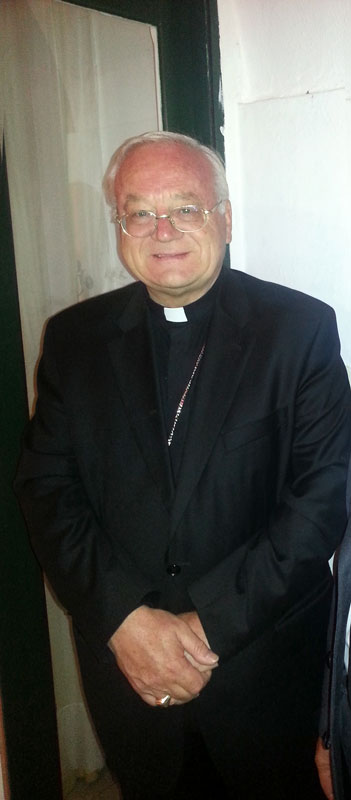
- Antoniazzi, 30 May 2013
- Church: Roman Catholic Church
- Archdiocese: Archdiocese of Tunis
- Appointed: 21 February 2013
- Retired: 4 April 2024
- Predecessor: Maroun Lahham
- Successor: Nicolas Lhernould

Orders
- Ordination: 24 June 1972 by Giacomo Giuseppe Beltritti
- Consecration: 16 March 2013 by Fouad Boutros Twal

Personal details
- Born: 23 April 1948 (age 78) San Polo di Piave, Province of Treviso, Italy
- Education: Latin Patriarch of Jerusalem
- Motto: Turris Fortissima Nomen Domini

Styles of Ilario Antoniazzi
- Reference style: The Most Reverend
- Spoken style: Your Excellency
- Religious style: Monsignor
- Posthumous style: none

Ilario Antoniazzi (born 23 April 1948) was the archbishop of the Archdiocese of Tunis 2013 to 2024.

== Biography ==
Born in Rai, frazione of San Polo di Piave on 23 April 1948. In 1962 he entered the Seminary of Jerusalem and in 1972 he was ordained as a priest.

For many years he was pastor in various parishes of the patriarchy, and since 2011 has also served as director of the 44 Catholic schools in the patriarchy.

On 21 February 2013 Pope Benedict XVI appointed him as archbishop of the Archdiocese of Tunis. He was ordained on March 16 and installed on April 7.

He speaks Italian and French, but is fluent also in Arabic and English.

Pope Francis accepted his resignation on 4 April 2024.

=== Motto ===
TURRIS FORTISSIMA NOMEN DOMINI
(The name of the Lord is the strongest tower)
