= Laham =

Laham or Lahham is a common Arabic surname that translates to butcher. It also appears frequently with the Arabic definite article as Al-Laham and Al-Lahham.

Laham, Lahham and variants may refer to

== Laham ==
- Gregory III Laham (born 1933), Patriarch of Antioch, the spiritual leader of the Melkite Greek Catholic Church
- Mohammad Jihad al-Laham, Syrian politician who has been the Speaker of the People's Council of Syria
- Mussab Al-Laham (born 1991), Jordanian football player

== Lahham ==
- Duraid Lahham, leading Syrian comedian and director
- Maroun Lahham (born 1948), first Archbishop of the Roman Catholic Archdiocese of Tunis
