= Major Seminary of Tunis =

- Grand Séminaire de Tunis
- Latin: Seminarium Tunetanus
- Former names: Major Seminary of Carthage
- Type: Roman Catholic seminary
- Active: 1881–1964
- Affiliations: White Fathers
- Founder: Charles Lavigerie
- Location: Tunis, Tunisia
- Language: French

The Major Seminary of Tunis (French: Grand Séminaire de Tunis), previously known as the Major Seminary of Carthage, was a Roman Catholic major seminary and the diocesan seminary for the Archdiocese of Tunis. Established in 1881 by Bishop Charles Lavigerie, the seminary was founded for the education of White Fathers missionaries in Africa. It educated both religious and diocesan priests until its closure in 1964. The seminary building, known as La Marsa, also held an extensive museum containing relics from Tunisia's history.

== History ==
The seminary was founded in 1881 by Bishop Charles Lavigerie.

In 1882, the White Fathers' scholasticate was added to the seminary.

It closed in 1964 and the building, located in the Carthage suburb of Tunis, became the National School of Administration.

== Campus ==
The seminary was located in a building called La Marsa. Construction began in 1879 and the building was completed in 1881.

== Rectors ==
Léonce Bridoux became rector in the late 1870s.

== Notable alumni ==
- Jean-Marie Colibault
