= Carthage (municipality) =

Commune in Tunis Governorate, Tunisia

Carthage قرطاج
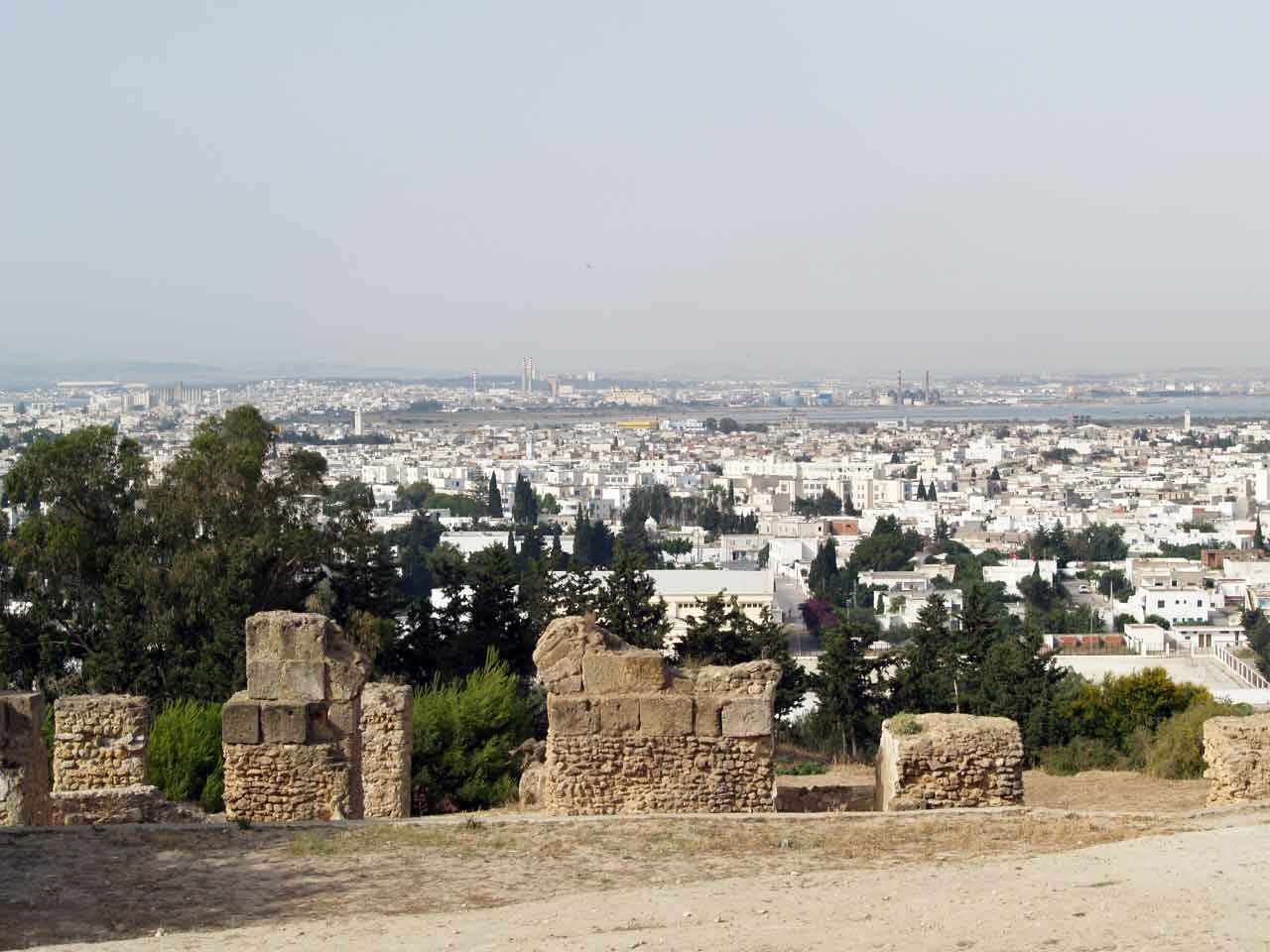
- Partial view of the modern municipality from Amilcar in Sidi Bou Said

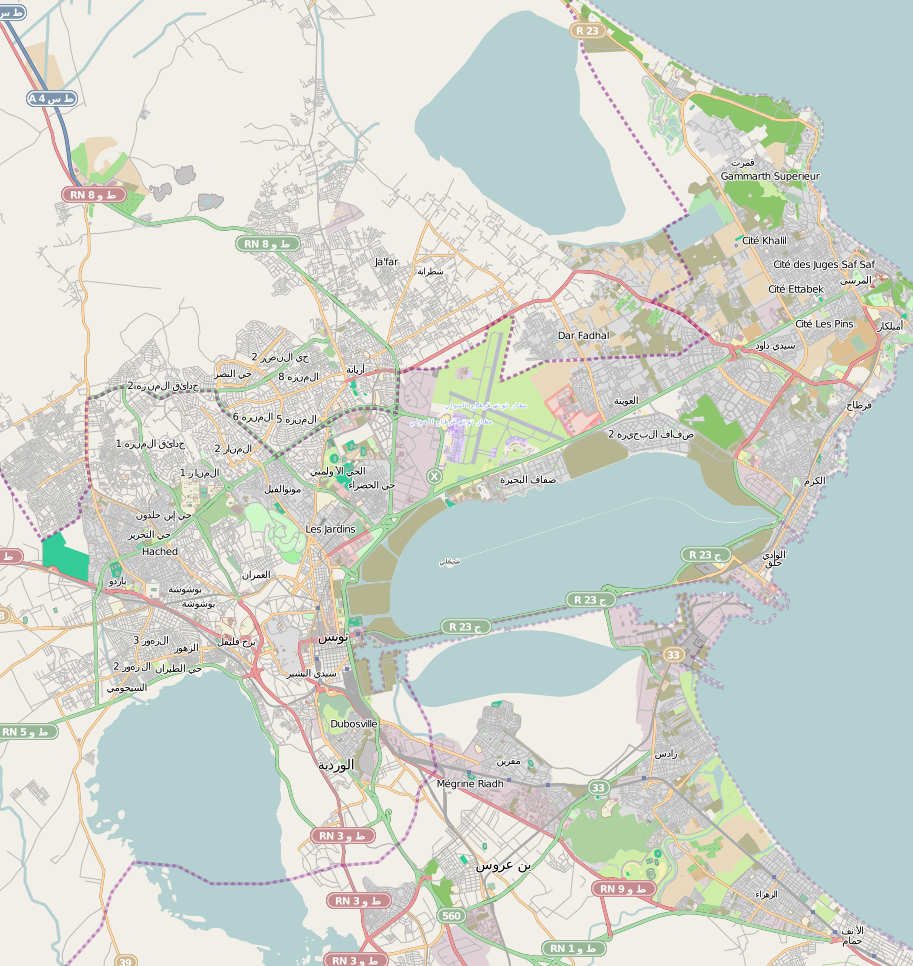
- Location in Greater Tunis Carthage (Tunisia)
- Coordinates: 36°51′18″N 10°19′50″E
- Country: Tunisia
- Governorate: Tunis Governorate
- Delegation(s): Carthage

Government
  - Mayor: Hayet Bayoudh (Tahya Tounes)
  - Deputy Mayor: Omar Fendri

Area
  - Total: 180 km^{2} (69 sq mi)

Population (2014)
  - Total: 24,216
  - Density: 130/km^{2} (350/sq mi)
- Time zone: UTC+01:00 (CET)
- Postal code: 1000
- Website: www.commune-carthage.gov.tn/fr/

Carthage (/ˈkɑːrθɪdʒ/ KAR-thij; Arabic: قرطاج, romanized: Qarṭāj) is a commune in Tunis Governorate, Tunisia. It is named for, and includes in its area, the archaeological site of Carthage.

Established in 1919, Carthage is some 15 km to the east-northeast of Tunis, situated between the towns of Sidi Bou Said to the north and Le Kram to the south. It is reached from Tunis by the R23 road via La Goulette, or by the N9 road via Tunis–Carthage International Airport.

The population as of January 2013 was estimated at 21,277, mostly attracting the wealthier residents. The Carthage Palace (the Tunisian presidential palace) is located on the coast.

Carthage has six train stations of the TGM line between Le Kram and Sidi Bou Said: Carthage Salammbo (named for the ancient children's cemetery where it stands), Carthage Byrsa (named for Byrsa hill), Carthage Dermech (Dermèche), Carthage Hannibal (named for Hannibal), Carthage Présidence (named for the Presidential Palace) and Carthage Amilcar (named for Hamilcar).

== History ==
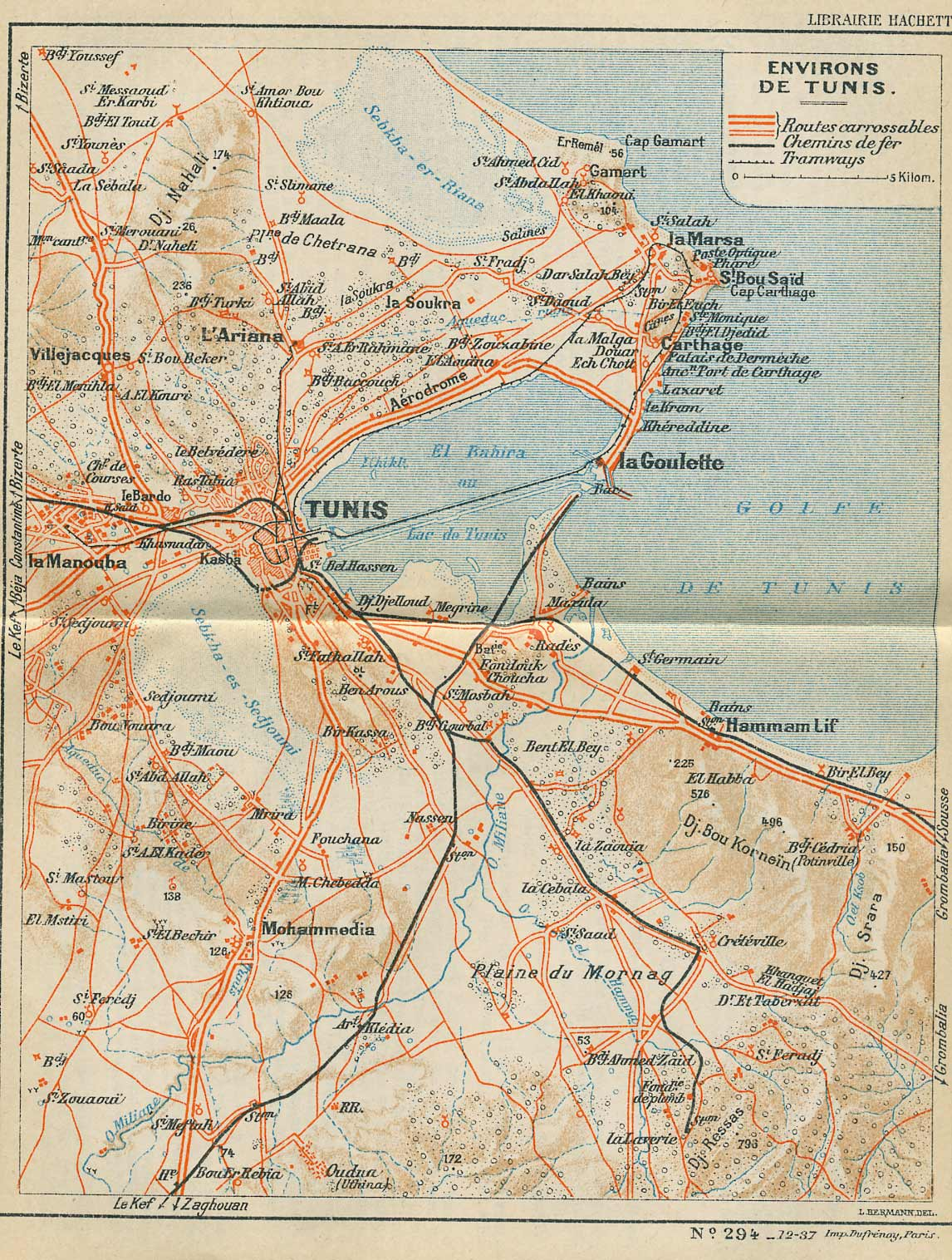
1937 map of Tunis and environs

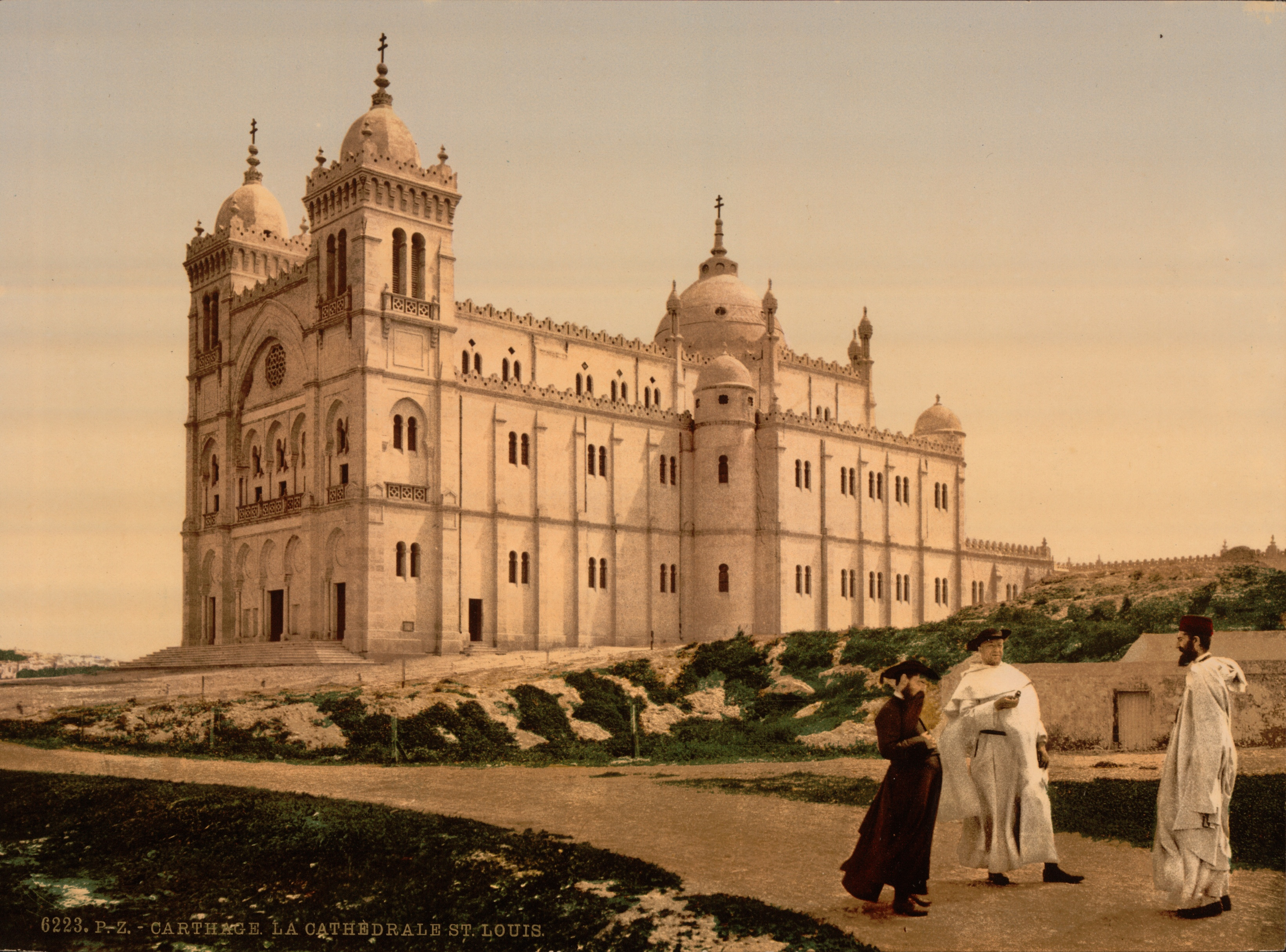
Saint Louis Cathedral (1899 photograph)

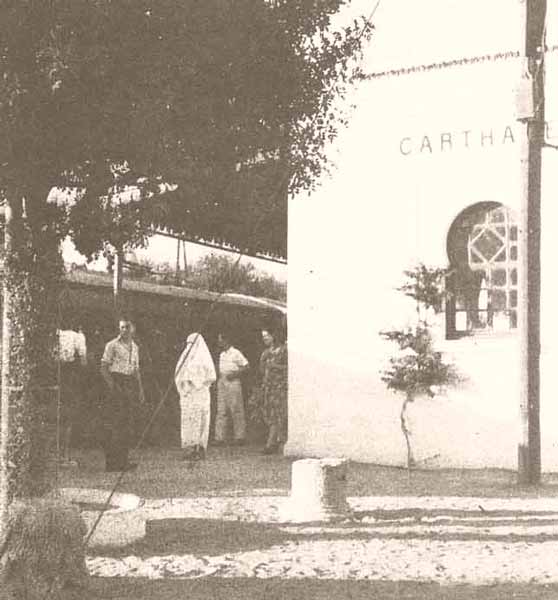
TGM station Carthage (1940s photograph)

Roman Carthage was destroyed following the Muslim invasion of 698, and it remained under the control of the Arabs and later under Ottoman rule for more than a thousand years (being replaced in the function of regional capital by the Medina of Tunis), until the establishment of the French protectorate of Tunisia in 1881.

The cathedral of St. Louis of Carthage was built on Byrsa hill in 1884. In 1885, Pope Leo XIII acknowledged the revived Archdiocese of Carthage as the primatial see of Africa and Charles Lavigerie as primate. European-style villas were built along the beach beginning in 1906; one such villa was chosen by Habib Bourguiba as the presidential palace in 1960.

The municipality was created by a decree of the Bey of Tunis on 15 June 1919, during the rule of Naceur Bey.

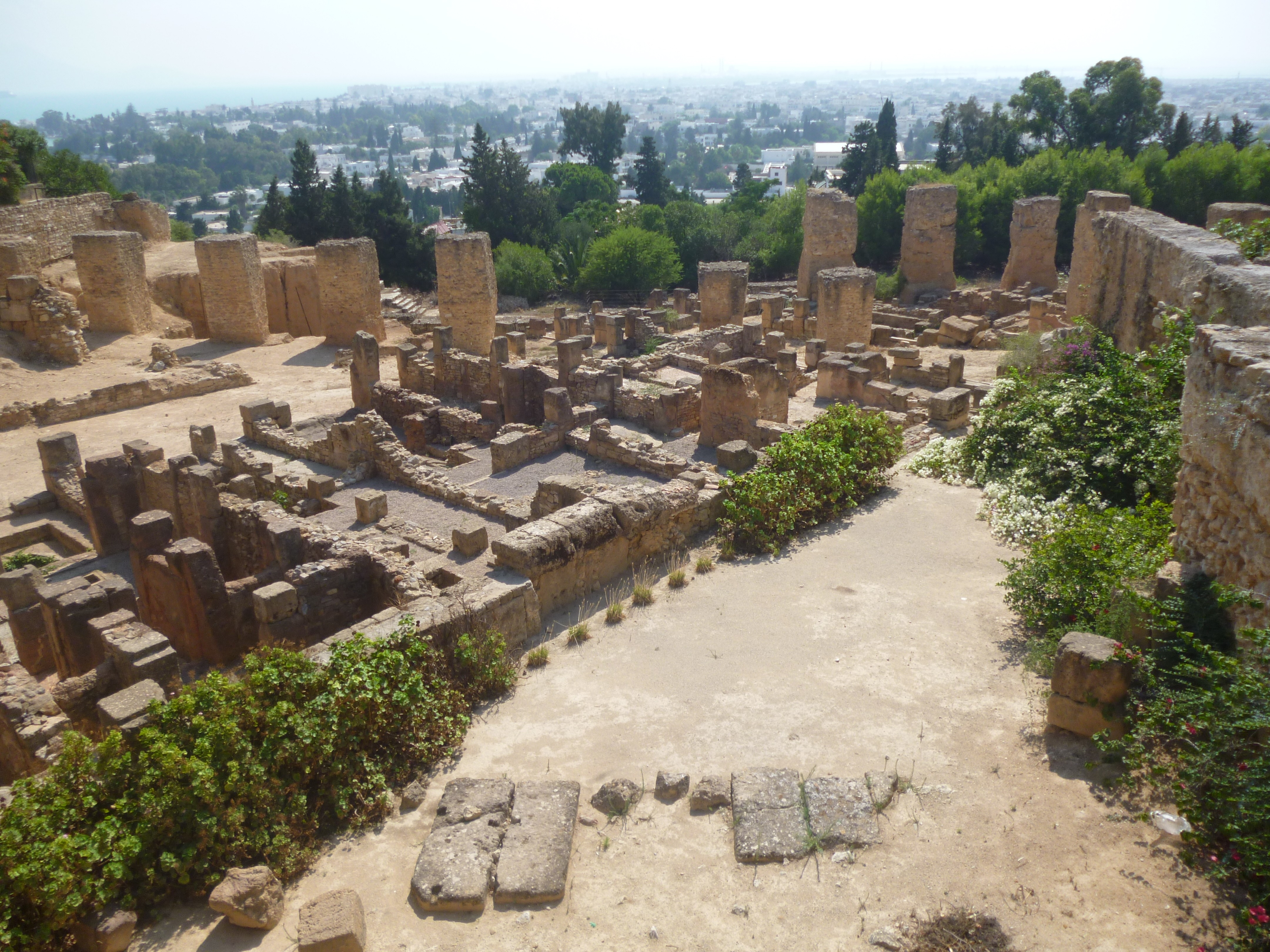
Archaeological site of Carthage

Construction of the Tunis–Carthage International Airport, which was fully funded by France, began in 1944, and in 1948 the airport become the main hub for Tunisair.

In the 1950s, the Lycée Français de Carthage was established to serve French families in Carthage. In 1961, it was given to the Tunisian government as a part of the Independence of Tunisia, so the nearby Collège Maurice Cailloux in La Marsa, previously an annex of the Lycée Français de Carthage, was renamed to the Lycée Français de La Marsa and began serving the lycée level. It is currently the Lycée Gustave Flaubert.

After Tunisian independence in 1956, the Tunis conurbation gradually extended around the airport, and Carthage is now a suburb of Tunis.

In February 1985, Ugo Vetere, the mayor of Rome, and Chedli Klibi, the mayor of Carthage, signed a symbolic treaty "officially" ending the conflict between their cities, which had been supposedly extended by the lack of a peace treaty for more than 2,100 years.

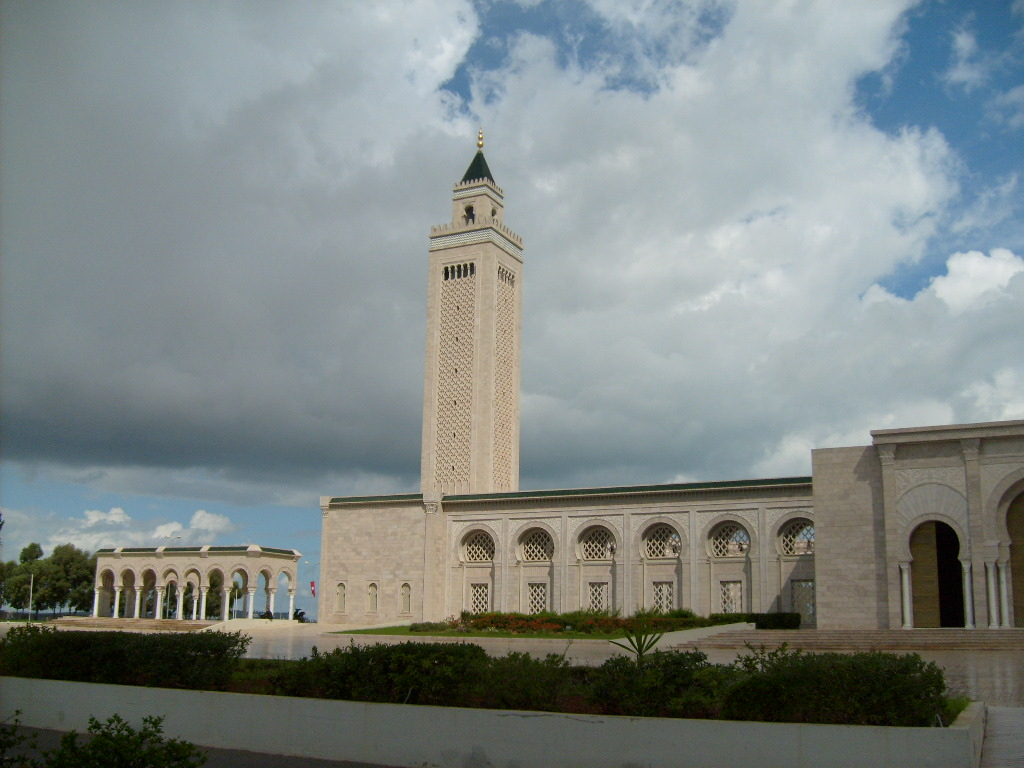
Malik ibn Anas mosque (southern facade, 2008 photograph)

The office of mayor was held by Chedli Klibi from 1963 to 1990, by Fouad Mebazaa from 1995 to 1998 and by Sami Tarzi from 2003 to 2011, and by Azedine Beschaouch from 2011. The monumental Malik ibn Anas mosque (also El Abidine mosque; (جامع مالك بن أنس (سابقا جامع العابدين) )), built on an area of three hectares on Odéon hill, was inaugurated in 2003.

== See also ==
- Ancient Carthage
- Carthage (archaeological site)
- History of Carthage
- List of cities in Tunisia
