= Nicolas Lhernould =

French archbishop

His Excellency Nicolas Lhernould
- Archbishop of Tunis
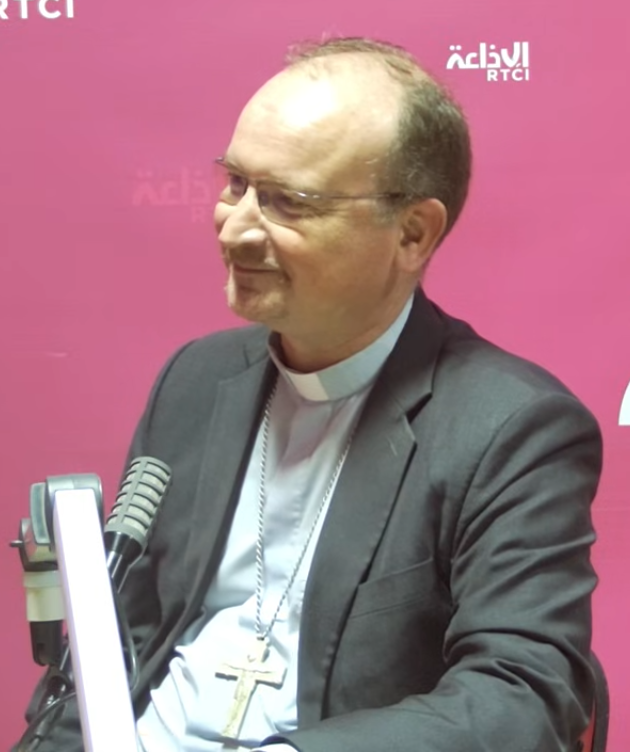
- Archbishop Lhernould in 2025
- Appointed: 4 April 2024
- Predecessor: Ilario Antoniazzi
- Previous post: Bishop of Constantine (2020–2024)

Orders
- Ordination: 22 May 2004
- Consecration: 8 February 2020 by Cristóbal López Romero

Personal details
- Born: 23 March 1975 (age 51) Courbevoie, France
- Denomination: Catholic Church
- Motto: "Fiat"
- Coat of arms

Nicolas Pierre Jean Lhernould (born 23 March 1975) is a French-born prelate of the Catholic Church who has been archbishop of Tunis since 2024. He was Bishop of Constantine in Algeria from 2020 to 2024. He has worked in Tunisia since 2005.

== Biography ==
Nicolas Lhernould was born on 23 March 1975 in Courbevoie, on the outskirts of Paris. He attended the Lycée Sainte-Marie in Neuilly. He made his first trip to Tunisia in 1994 as part of group of young teachers sent by the Lycée. He obtained a licentiate in sociology from the University of Paris-Nanterre in 1995 and a master's degree in econometrics in 1996, and then a degree in social sciences from the École Normale Supérieure de Cachan in 1997. He returned to Tunisia in 1997 for a two-year stint teaching mathematics in Marianist schools. While there he asked to be prepared for the local priesthood, making him one of the minority of priests there who were not members of a religious congregation.

Beginning in 1999, he lived at the Pontifical French Seminary in Rome under sponsorship of the Archdiocese of Tunis. After completing his theological studies, he earned a bachelor's degree in theology at the Pontifical Gregorian University in 2003 and he was ordained a priest of the Archdiocese of Tunis on 22 May 2004. He then earned a licenciate in sciences and patristic theology at the Patristic Institute Augustinianum in 2006, writing a study of the sermons of Fulgentius of Ruspe.

In Tunisia, he was pastor of Sousse, Monastir, and Mahdia in the southern part of the country from 2005 to 2012. He was pastor of Sainte-Jeanne d'Arc parish in Tunis and vicar general of the diocese from 2012 to 2019. From 2009 to 2014 he was president of the Association of the Carthage Study Center (Center d'Études de Catharge), a research library and conference center.

In July 2019 he was appointed to a five-year term as national director for Tunisia of the Pontifical Mission Societies.

Pope Francis appointed him bishop of Constantine on 9 December 2019. At the time he was the youngest French bishop. His episcopal consecration in the Cathedral of Saint Vincent de Paul in Tunis by Cardinal Cristóbal López Romero, Archbishop of Rabat, on 8 February 2020 was the first in Tunisia since 1962. He was installed as bishop in the Basilica of St. Augustine in Annaba on 29 February.

Pope Francis named him archbishop of Tunis on 4 April 2024. Lhernould was installed in the Cathedral of Saint Vincent de Paul and Saint Olive of Tunis there on 8 June.

He was elected to a three-year term as vice-president of the Regional Episcopal Conference of North Africa (CERNA) in February 2022.
