= Cathedral of Saint Vincent de Paul =

Roman Catholic church located in Tunis, Tunisia

- Cathedral of Saint Vincent de Paul and Saint Olivia
- كاتدرائية القديس فنسون دو بول بتونس
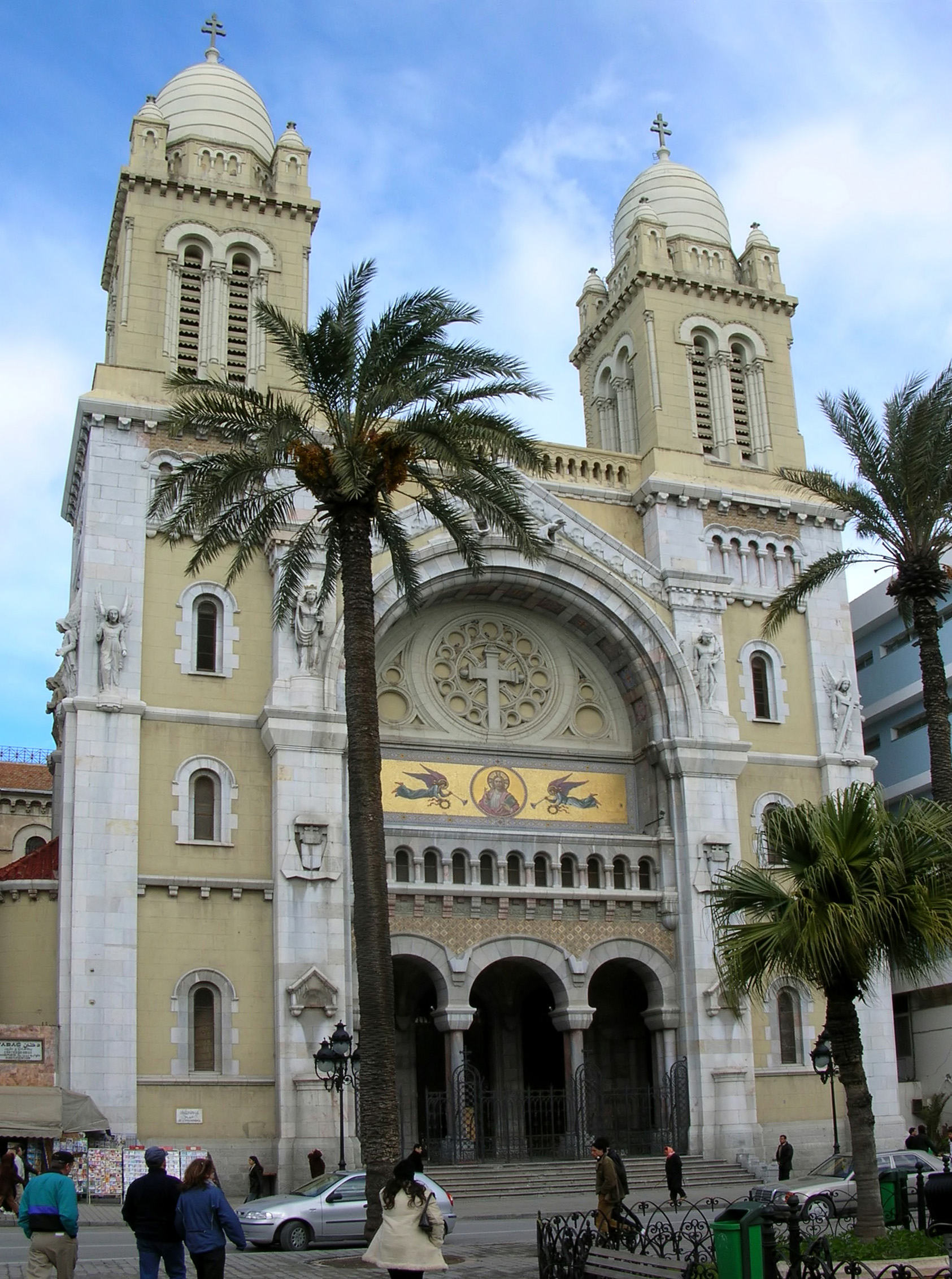
- Façade of the cathedral
- Cathedral of Saint Vincent de Paul
- 36°48′0″N 10°10′44″E
- Location: Tunis
- Country: Tunisia
- Denomination: Roman Catholic Church
- Churchmanship: Roman Rite
- Website: www.eglisecatholiquetunisie.com

History
- Status: Cathedral
- Dedication: St. Vincent de Paul & St. Olivia

Architecture
- Functional status: Active
- Previous cathedrals: Saint Louis Cathedral
- Architect: L. Bonnet-Labranche
- Architectural type: church
- Style: Moorish, Gothic, Neo-Byzantine
- Groundbreaking: 1890
- Completed: 1897

Specifications
- Length: 75 m (246 ft)
- Width: 32 m (105 ft)
- Height: 55 m (180 ft)

Administration
- Province: Archdiocese of Tunis

Clergy
- Archbishop: Nicolas Lhernould

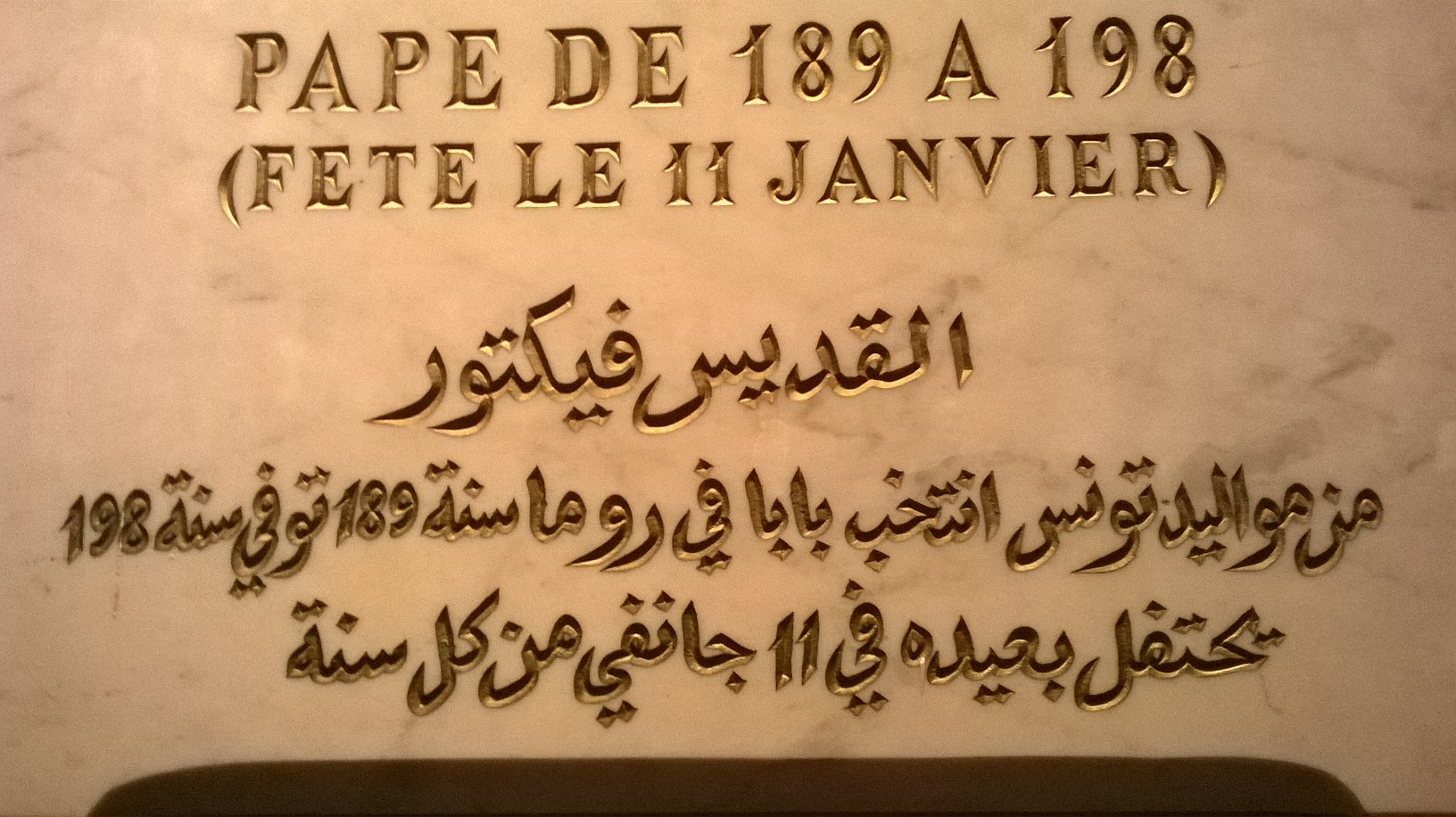
Bilingual plaque in the Cathedral of Saint Vincent de Paul, Tunis, commemorating Pope Victor I (r. AD 189–199), who was from Africa Proconsularis and, thus, possibly from modern Tunisia.

The Cathedral of St. Vincent de Paul & St. Olivia (Arabic: كاتدرائية القديس فنسون دو بول بتونس, romanized: Kātidrāʾiyyat al-Qiddīs Finsūn dū Būl bi-Tūnis; French: Cathédrale Saint Vincent de Paul et Sainte Olive) is a Catholic church located in Tunis, Tunisia, which serves as the cathedral of the Archdiocese of Tunis. The church is dedicated to St. Vincent de Paul, a French patron saint of charity who was enslaved there by pirates as a young man, and to St. Olivia of Palermo, who was believed to have been imprisoned and martyred in that city in the 5th century. It is the episcopal see of the Archdiocese of Tunis and is situated at Place de l'Indépendance in Ville Nouvelle, a crossroads between Avenue Habib Bourguiba and Avenue de France, opposite the French embassy.

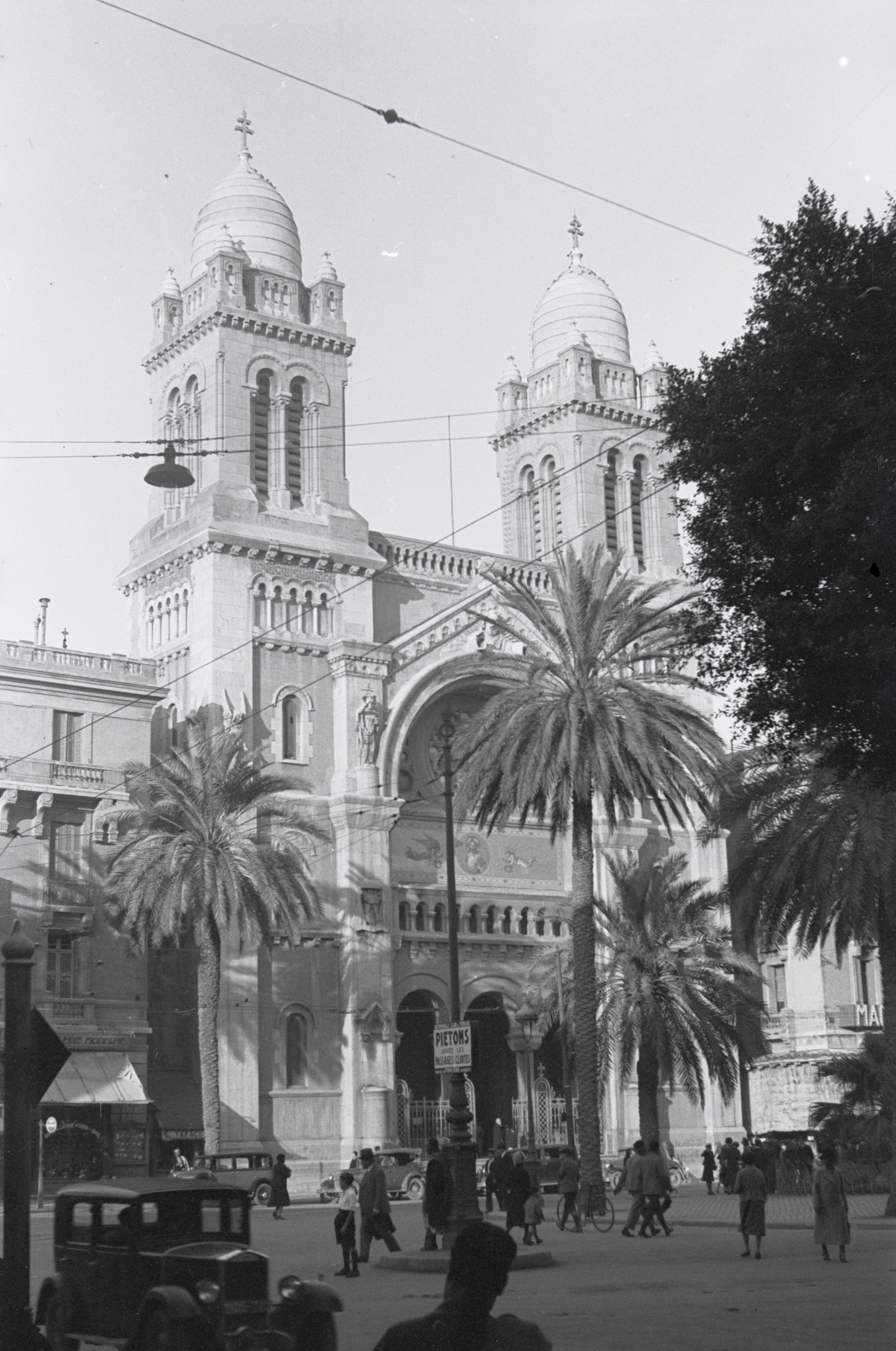
The cathedral in 1932

The church, designed by L. Bonnet-Labranche, was built in a mixture of styles, including Moorish revival, Gothic revival, and Neo-Byzantine architectural traditions. The cornerstone was laid in 1890, and construction began in 1893. The church was opened on Christmas in 1897, albeit without its belltowers owing to a shortage of funds. The reinforced concrete towers were completed in 1910 using the Hennebique technique.

Cardinal Charles Lavigerie, M.Afr., laid the cornerstone of the church on 7 November 1881. It was built as a pro-cathedral a little further down Avenue de la Marine (now Avenue Habib Bourguiba) from the then-existing cathedral of the diocese (then called Carthage) being the Saint Louis Cathedral. The original cathedral had been built quickly, but its condition soon deteriorated due to adverse ground conditions, necessitating the construction of the current cathedral.

The number of Catholics in Tunisia fell rapidly following Tunisian independence from France. As of 2024, out of an estimated population of some 20,000 Catholics in the region, some 1,500 are active in the parish.

A modus vivendi reached between the Republic of Tunisia and the Vatican in 1964 resulted in the transfer of selected buildings of the diocese to the Tunisian state for public use, including the former cathedral, now the Acropolium of Carthage. However, the Cathedral of St. Vincent de Paul remains under the ownership and operation of the Roman Catholic Church in Tunisia.

== See also ==
- Chapelle Saint-Louis de Carthage
