= Olivia of Palermo =

Christian virgin-martyr

Saint Olivia of Palermo
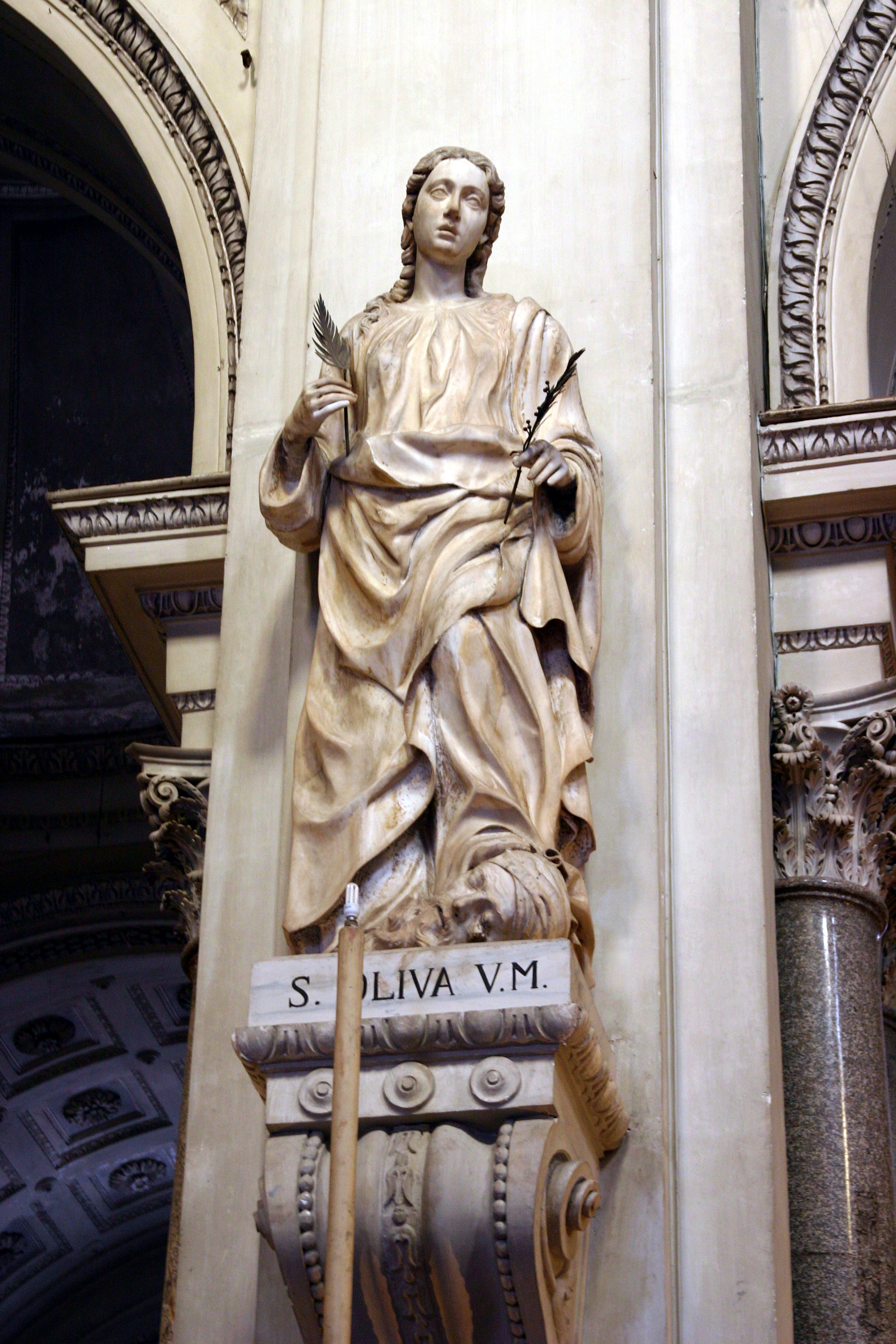
- Statue of Olivia in the Cathedral of Palermo

Virgin Martyr
- Born: 448; Palermo, Sicily
- Died: 463; Tunis, Roman Africa
- Venerated in: Roman Catholic Church; Eastern Orthodox Church
- Feast: 10 June
- Patronage: Sicilian towns of: Palermo; Monte San Giuliano; Termini Imerese; Alcamo; Pettineo; Cefalù.; Olesa de Montserrat (Catalonia).

Olivia of Palermo (Italian: Oliva dì Palermo, Sicilian: Uliva di Palermu), Palermo, 448 – Tunis, 10 June 463, while according to another tradition she is supposed to have lived in the late 9th century AD in the Muslim Emirate of Sicily is a Christian virgin-martyr who was venerated as a local patron saint of Palermo, Sicily, since the Middle Ages, as well as in the Sicilian towns of Monte San Giuliano, Termini Imerese, Alcamo, Pettineo and Cefalù.

Her feast day is on 10 June, and in art she is shown as a young woman surrounded of olive branches, holding a cross in her right hand. (Note: The cross is extremely faded, but it is still visible on the 13th-century icon of Olivia. Any Saints who were murdered for confessing the Faith are shown with crosses in iconography.)

== Hagiographic sources ==
Olivia seems to have been sanctified by popular tradition alone as a pious local saint since her name was not recorded historically in any mainstream Latin or Greek martyrology or Hagiology of the church.

The oldest textual sources of her Life include a Gallo-siculo Breviary of the twelfth century, which records her memory and is still preserved in Palermo, as well as a document in vulgar Sicilian of the fourteenth century found in Termini Imerese, and a Life contained in a lectionary of the fifteenth century. (Note: The first reference to Saint Olivia which is made by a non-Sicilian writer is that of a Bishop of Kabylie (Italian: vescovo cabillunense) in Topographia Martyrologii (Venezia 1450, p. 128): Agnello, 1955, p. 109.)

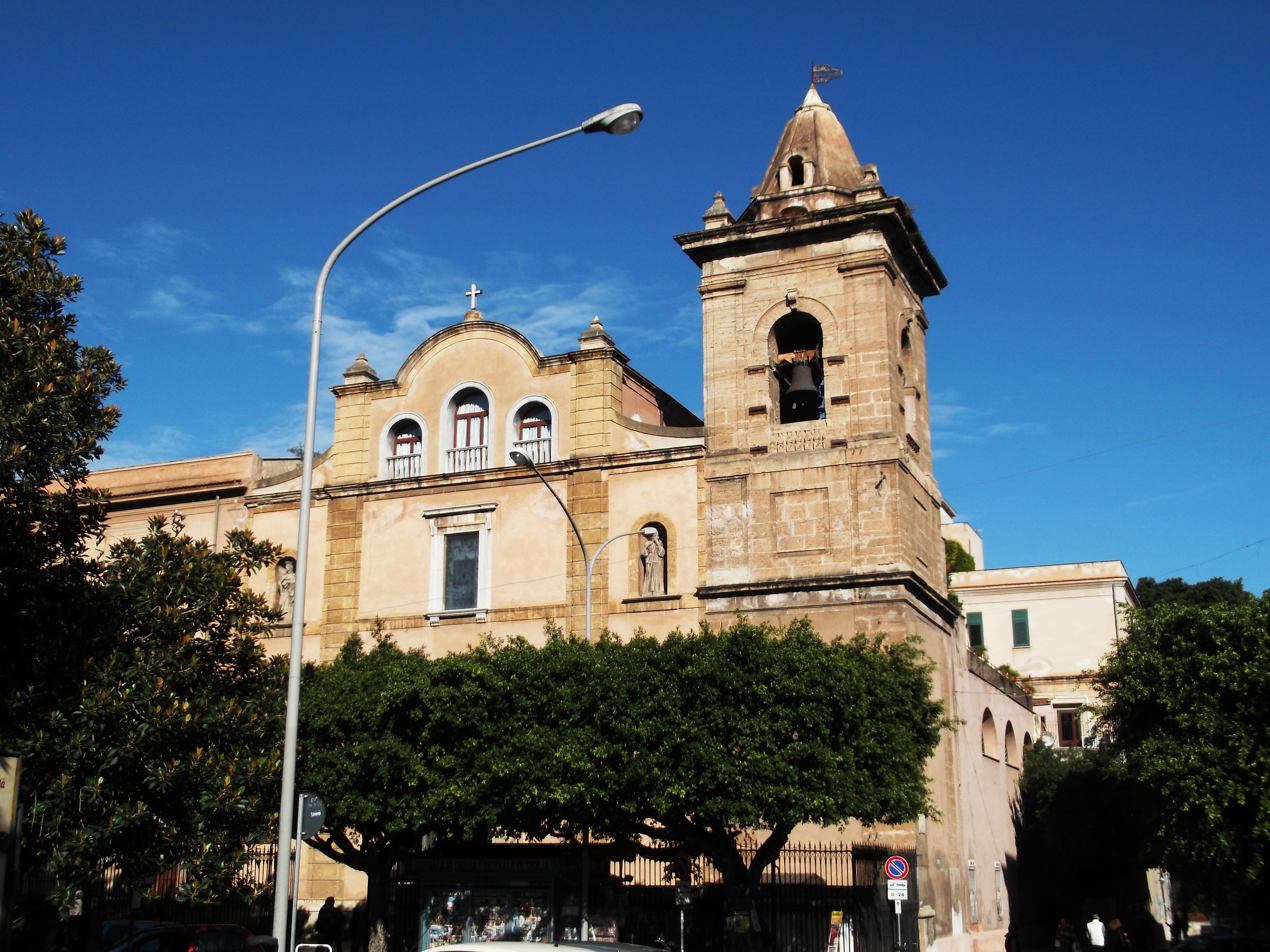
The Church of St Francis of Paola in Palermo, on the site of the former Church of St. Olivia.

A venerable icon of Olivia also exists, (Note: The icon was formerly kept at the Civic Hospital of Palermo, but is currently located at the Diocesan Museum of Palermo.) perhaps of the twelfth century, which depicts Saint Olivia with saints Elias, Venera and Rosalia.

There are also references to a church being dedicated to her in Palermo since AD 1310 on the supposed site of her burial. Today, this is the Chiesa di San Francesco di Paola (Church of Saint Francis of Paola).

In addition, numerous Lives of this Saint were published in Sicily, both in prose and in verse, and the form of sacred representation until the end of the eighteenth century, reflecting the fair vitality of her cult. She is recorded in the Sicilian martyrology of Ottavio Gaetani, (Note: After he died in AD 1620 his manuscript of the Lives of Sicilian saints was edited by Fr. Peter Salerno SJ.) as well as in the Palmerian martyrology of Antonio Mongitore in 1742. A Breviary from Cefalù also contains a detailed entry on her Life (Breviary Cefaludes).

The Bollandists published in 1885 the Acts of Saint Olivia, which they took from the lectionary of the church in Palermo.

Moreover, Sicily's well-known writer of the 17th century, the poet Petru Fudduni (born Pietro Fullone) wrote a poem in 114 octaves about her. At the same time, a dramatic opera of Gioacchino Bona Fardella, a tragedy in three acts, was also famous in its day. (Note: Other examples of the expression of her cult include: V. Auria, Leggendario delle Sante Vergini, Palermo 1661; B. Faso, Le cinque Vergini prudenti palermitane assieme ai Racconti delle loro sacre traslazioni, Palermo 1662; G. Spucces, Vita di S. Oliva vergine e martire palermitana cavata dai mss. antichi della S. Chiesa cattedrale di Palermo, Palermo 1670; Agnello, 1955, pp. 109–110, who refers to an Italian composition on the subject, being a tragedy of Lorenzo De Marini that was given in Rome in the early eighteenth century: L. De Marini, S. Oliva, Roma 1726.)

== Hagiographic life ==
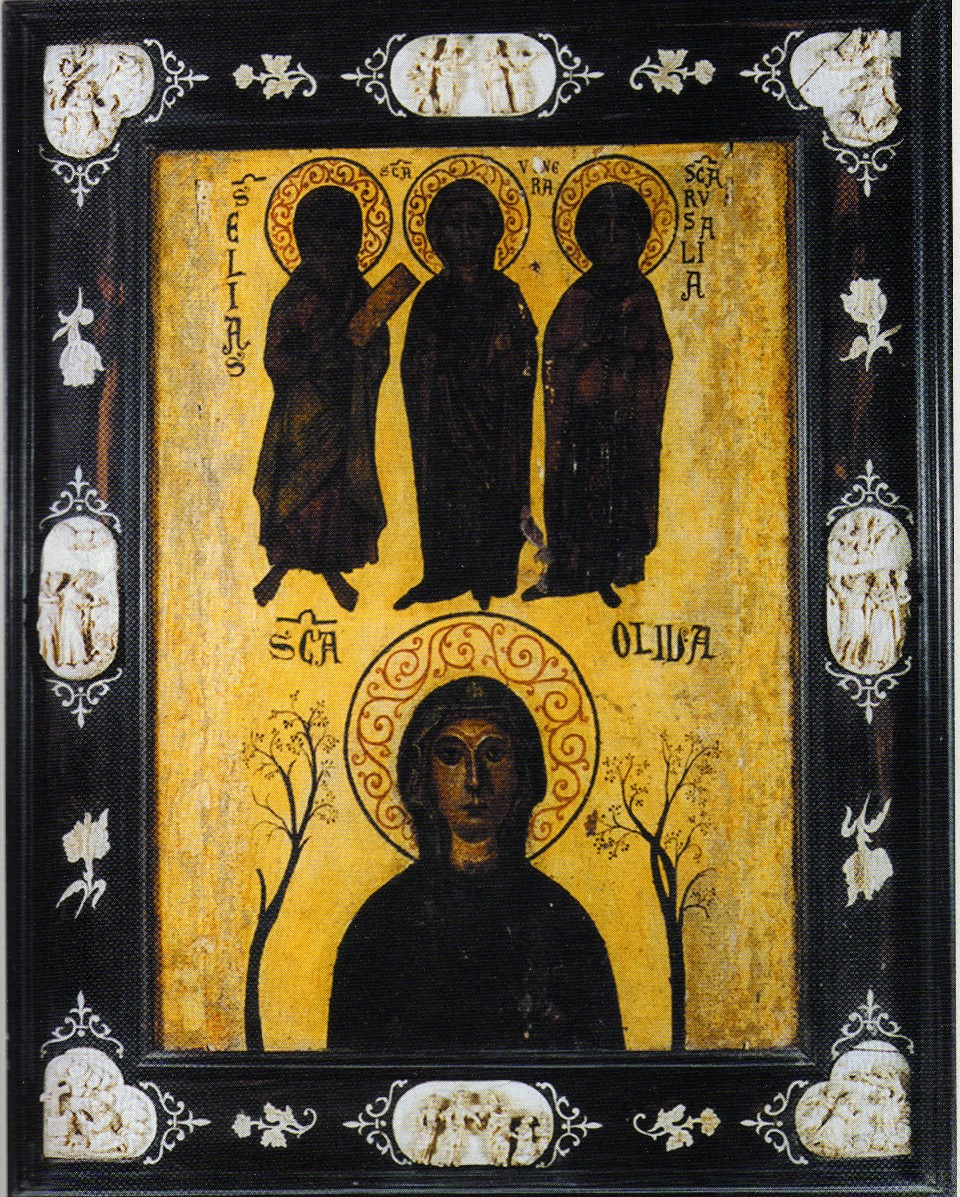
Olivia with the saints Elias, Venera and Rosalia, 13th century.

According to the hagiographic legend, Olivia was the beautiful daughter of a noble Sicilian family, born either around 448 or in the 9th century AD. Local hagiographers state that she was born in the Loggia district of Palermo. From her early years she devoted herself to the Lord, declining honours and riches and giving charity to the poor. In one version, in 454 AD Genseric, king of the Vandals, conquered Sicily and occupied Palermo, started martyring many Christians. When she was thirteen, Olivia comforted the prisoners and urged the Christians to remain steadfast in their faith. The Vandals were impressed by the strength of her spirit, seeing that nothing could prevail against her faith. So in deference to her noble house, they sent her to Tunis, where the governor would attempt to overcome her constancy. In the other version, she was enslaved in 906 and sent to Tunis under the orders of the Emir of Sicily, then under Saracen rule.

In Tunis, Olivia worked miracles and began to convert the pagans or Muslim Saracens. The governor, therefore, ordered that she be relegated to a lonely place as a hermitess, where there were wild animals, hoping that the beasts would devour her or that she would die of hunger. However, the wild animals lived peacefully around her. One day some men from Tunis who were hunting found her, and impressed by her beauty, tried to abuse her, but Olivia converted them too with the word of the Lord, and they were baptized. After miraculously curing many of the sick and suffering in the region, Olivia converted many pagans or Muslims to the Christian faith. When the governor heard about these things, he had her arrested and imprisoned in the city in an attempt to make her apostatize. She was scourged and was stripped and submerged into a cauldron of boiling oil, but these tortures did not cause her any harm, nor did they make her renounce her faith. Finally, she was beheaded on 10 June of the year 463 or sometime in the 10th century, and her soul "flew to the sky in the form of a dove" (Italian: "sotto forma di colomba volò al cielo"). (Note: One the Sicilian Breviaries has this entry for Saint Olivia: (in Italian) "A Tunisi il martirio di S. Oliva vergine e martire, cittadina palermitana e patrona principale, la quale, nata da nobile famiglia, ancora fanciulla, nella persecuzione vandalica per la fede di Cristo cacciata in esilio, a Tunisi attrasse molti alla fede cattolica; superati poi l'eculeo, le unghie di ferro e il fuoco, divinamente liberata dall'olio incandescente, troncato alla fine il capo, le fu data la corona del martirio, la cui anima, tutti ammirando, sotto forma di colomba volò al cielo l'anno 463 ".)

== Veneration ==
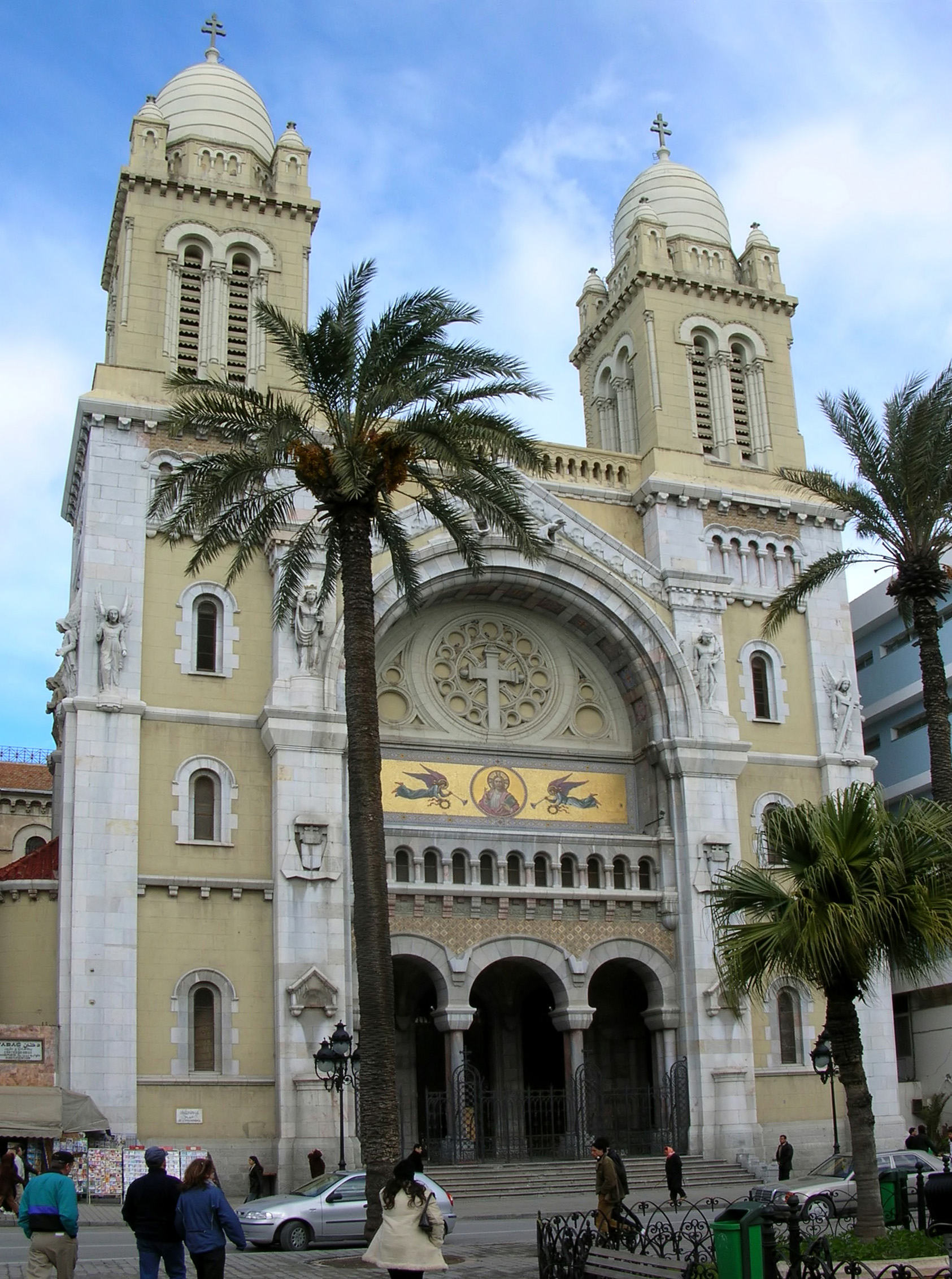
The Cathedral of St. Vincent de Paul and Saint Olivia, in Tunis.

=== Patronage of Palermo ===
At the end of 1500, her cause was spread by the Franciscans, who sought her body.

On 5 June 1606, the people and Senate of Palermo elected Saint Olivia as Patroness of the city, together with Saint Agatha, Saint Christina and Saint Nympha. These four were chosen for each of the four major parts of the city. Their commemoration was entered in the Palermian Calendar by Cardinal Giannettino Doria in 1611.

Their veneration waned following the discovery in 1624 of the (alleged) relics of Saint Rosalia, who had appeared to rescue the city from the plague. After that, Saint Rosalia began to be venerated as a patroness of the city as well.

In 1940, a parish was dedicated to Saint Olivia in the city. She was commemorated by the Church in Palermo until 1980 as an obligatory memorial. However, in 1981, her feast was deleted from the local liturgical calendar.

In Tunis, the Roman Catholic Cathedral of St. Vincent de Paul and Saint Olivia are also dedicated to her. It was begun in 1893, replacing the oldest Christian monument in the city – a chapel built by Father Jean Le Vacher in 1650 – and was opened on Christmas Day 1897.

=== Saint Olivia and Islam in Tunisia ===
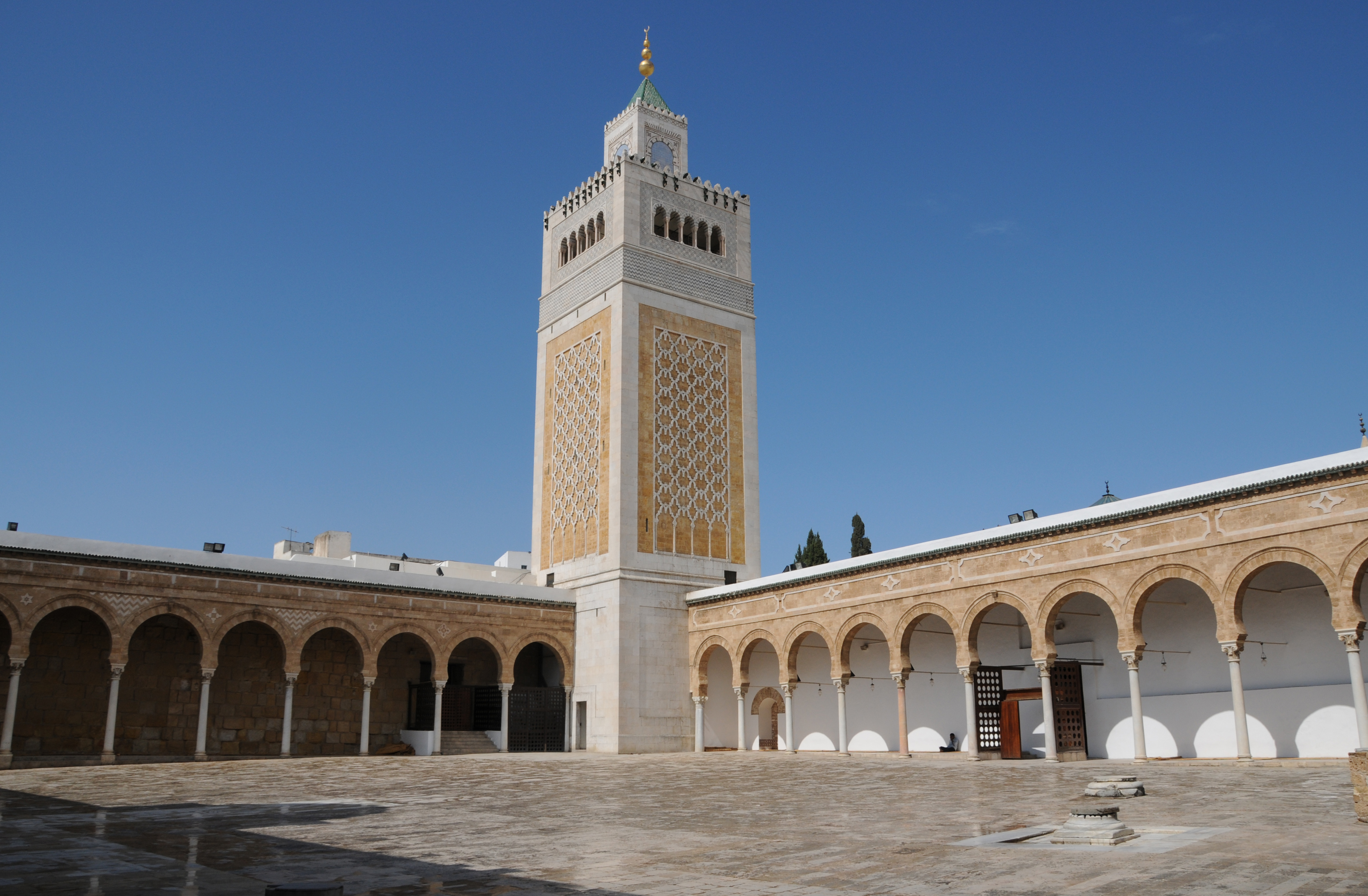
Al-Zaytuna Mosque (Mosque of Olive), in Tunis, Tunisia. Interior Courtyard and main minaret.

The Great Mosque of Al-Zaytuna ("Mosque of Olive") is the oldest in Tunis, the capital of Tunisia, and covers an area of 5,000 square metres (1.2 acres) with nine entrances. The exact date of the mosque's foundation varies according to different historical sources. Modern historians have been divided over whether it should be attributed to Ubayd Allah ibn al-Habhab in the early 8th century or to Hasan ibn al-Nu'man at the end of the 7th century. Most scholars support the second scenario and attribute the foundation to Ibn al-Nu'man in 698 CE.

One legend states that it was called "Mosque of Olive" because it was built on an ancient place of worship where there was an olive. Another account, transmitted by the 17th century Tunisian historian Ibn Abi Dinar, reports the presence of a Byzantine Christian church dedicated to Santa Olivia at that location. Archeological investigations and restoration works in 1969–1970 have shown that the mosque was built over an existing Byzantine-era building with columns, covering a cemetery. This may have been a Christian basilica, which provides support for the legend reported by Ibn Abi Dinar. A more recent scholarly interpretation by Muhammad al-Badji Ibn Mami, also endorsed by Sihem Lamine, suggests that the previous structures may have been part of a Byzantine fortification.

Olivia is particularly venerated in Tunisia because it is superstitiously thought that if the site and its memory are profaned, then misfortune will happen; this includes a belief that when her relics are recovered, Islam will end. This ancillary legend related to the discovery of the saint's relics is widespread in Sicily, however it is connected to other Saints as well.

In 1402 king Martin I of Sicily requested the return of Saint Olivia's relics from the Berber Caliph of Ifriqiya Abu Faris Abd al-Aziz II, who refused him.

== Historicity ==
The main criticism of the life of Olivia is that the elements of her legend do not have a personal nature in and of themselves, but they all derive, with slight modifications, from old themes or archetypes that were dear to the medieval imagination, such as that of the 'sacred heroine' or the 'persecuted maiden' . The Italian teacher and writer Giuseppe Agnello carefully undertook to sift the hagiographic tradition from the literary one and did not see anything more than a random homonymous saint of Palermo conflated with the heroine of the mystery play dedicated to her, which was studied extensively by Alessandro d'Ancona and Alexander Veselovsky (who in turn cited Ferdinand Wolf).

Nevertheless, Paul Collura (Note: Paolo Collura (1914-1997) was a Sicilian palaeographer, diplomat, historian and director of the Diocesan Museum of Palermo.) defends Olivia's historicity, writing that "the core of our ancient legends has a substrate that should not be underestimated, and since the Arab domination in Sicily (827–1092) made a clean sweep of all the written documents, sacred and profane, the memory of several Saints has been handed down only on the thread of memory."

Furthermore, it has been accurately pointed out that the Roman Catholic Church has remained somewhat aloof from Southern Italian saint cults.

== Sources ==
- (in Italian) Sant' Oliva di Palermo Vergine e martire. SANTI, BEATI E TESTIMONI. 10 giugno. Retrieved: February 2, 2015.
- (in Italian) Daniele Ronco (2001). Il Maggio di Santa Oliva: Origine Della Forma, Sviluppo Della Tradizione. ETS, Pisa University, IT. 325 pp.
- (in Latin) "ACTA SANCTAE OLIVAE." In: ANALECTA BOLLANDIANA. Tomus IV. Edidreunt: Carolus de Smedt, Gulielmus Van Hooff et Josephus de Backer (S.J.). Geneve: Societe Generale de Librairie Catholique, 1885. pp. 5–9.
