= Archdiocese of Tunis =

Catholic archdiocese in Tunisia

Coordinates: 36°48′01″N 10°10′44″E

Archdiocese of Tunis Latin: Archidioecesis Tunetanus Arabic: أبرشية تونس French: Archidiocèse de Tunis
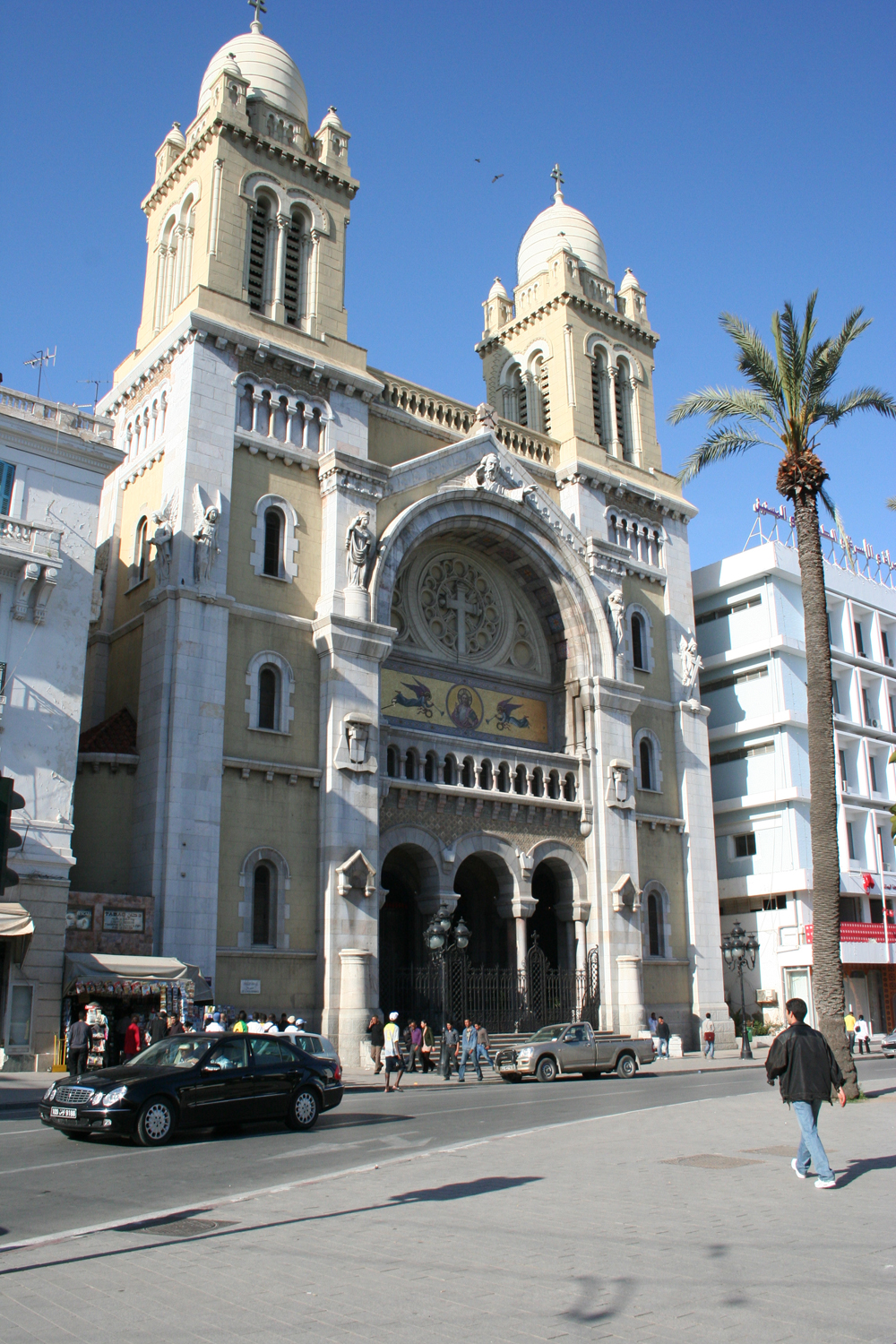
- St Vincent de Paul Cathedral in Tunis

Location
- Country: Tunisia

Statistics
- Area: 62,632 sq mi (162,220 km^{2})
- Population: Total; Catholics: 11,568,760 (2020); 30,440 (2020) (0.3%)

Information
- Denomination: Catholic
- Sui iuris church: Latin Church
- Rite: Roman Rite
- Cathedral: St Vincent de Paul

Current leadership
- Pope: Leo XIV
- Archbishop: Nicolas Lhernould
- Bishops emeritus: Ilario Antoniazzi

The Archdiocese of Tunis is a Latin Church ecclesiastical territory or diocese of the Catholic Church in Tunis, Tunisia. It was founded on 10 November 1884 under the name "Archdiocese of Carthage", with territory corresponding to that of the then French protectorate of Tunisia. On 9 July 1964, it became a territorial prelature under the ecclesiastical title of Prelature of Tunis. It was made a diocese, keeping the name of Tunis, on 31 May 1995, and raised to the rank of archdiocese on 22 May 2010.

The Cathedral of St. Vincent de Paul is the cathedral of the archdiocese of Tunis.

== History ==
=== Background: ancient see of Carthage ===
The ancient see of Carthage, which is now a titular see, was much less extensive than the modern archdiocese of Tunis. The territory of the archdiocese is coterminous with that of Tunisia, and thus corresponds approximately to that of the entire Roman provinces of Africa Proconsularis (Zeugitana) and Byzacena. The ancient diocese was only one of many bishoprics within the former of these Roman provinces. On the other hand, the archdiocese does not enjoy the influence that the ancient diocese had over a large number of bishoprics in an area, encompassing not only today's Tunisia but also much of Algeria.

The bishop of Tunis (episcopus Tuneiensis) was separate from the bishop of Carthage; known bishops included Lucianus, who attended the 411 Council of Carthage, and Sextilianus, sent by the bishop of Carthage to the Second Council of Constantinople in 553. In Pope Gregory VII's reign, a new bishop of Tunis had to be sent to Rome for consecration as there were not the necessary three bishops available near Carthage. Older sources identify Tunis with Tunnuna, the see of chronicler Victor of Tunnuna.

=== Apostolic prefecture ===
In 1684, Pope Urban VIII established an apostolic prefecture at Tunis for Ottoman Tunisia, which Pope Gregory XVI raised to the rank of an apostolic vicariate in 1843.

=== Apostolic administration ===
In 1881, Tunisia became a French protectorate, and in the same year Charles Lavigerie, who was archbishop of Algiers, became apostolic administrator of the vicariate of Tunis. In the following year, Lavigerie became a cardinal. He "saw himself as the reviver of the ancient Christian Church of Africa, the Church of Cyprian of Carthage", and, on 10 November 1884, was successful in his great ambition of having the metropolitan see of Carthage restored, with himself as its first archbishop. In 1053, Pope Leo IX settled a dispute about primacy in the Roman province of Africa between the bishops of Carthage and Gummi by declaring that, after the Bishop of Rome, the first archbishop and chief metropolitan of the whole of Africa is the bishop of Carthage nor can he, for the benefit of any bishop in the whole of Africa, lose the privilege received once for all from the holy Roman and apostolic see, but he will hold it until the end of the world as long as the name of our Lord Jesus Christ is invoked there, whether Carthage lie desolate or whether it some day rise glorious again." In line with this, Pope Leo XIII acknowledged the revived Archdiocese of Carthage as the primatial see of Africa and Lavigerie as primate. (The statement by Auguste Boudinhon that the acknowledgement was made in 1893, the year after Lavigerie's death, if not mistaken, is a reference to some renewed recognition.) From then until 1964, the Annuario Pontificio presented the see of Carthage as "founded in the 3rd century, metropolitan see of Proconsularis or Zeugitana, restored as archbishopric 10 November 1884".

In July 1964, pressure from President Habib Bourguiba's government of the Republic of Tunisia, which was in a position to close down all the Catholic churches in the country, forced the Holy See to abide by a modus vivendi bilateral agreement which regulated its legal status according to the 1959 Constitution of Tunisia. The modus vivendi gave the Catholic Church in Tunisia legal personality and stated that it was legally represented by the prelate nullius of Tunis. The Holy See chose the prelate nullius but the government could object against the candidate before an appointment. The modus vivendi banned the Catholic Church from any political activity in Tunisia. This particular agreement was unofficially described as instead a modus non moriendi ("a way of not dying"). By it, all but five of the country's more than seventy churches were handed over to the state, including what had been the cathedral of the archdiocese, while the state, for its part, promised that the buildings would be put only to use of public interest consonant with their previous function.

Pope Paul VI suppressed the Archdiocese of Carthage and erected the Prelature nullius of Tunis, in his 1964 apostolic constitution Prudens Ecclesiae, to conform to the bilateral agreement. The Archdiocese of Carthage reverted to the status of a titular see. The residential archdiocese's territory became that of the Territorial Prelature of Tunis, established on 9 July 1964. The first archbishop of the titular see, Agostino Casaroli, was appointed on 4 July 1967. The Annuario Pontificio of that period described the titular archiepiscopal see of Carthage as "founded in the 3rd century, metropolitan see of Proconsularis or Zeugitana, restored as an archiepiscopal see on 10 November 1884, titular archbishopric 9 July 1964". The history of the territorial prelature was given as "founded 9 July 1964, previously an archbishopric under the name of Carthage founded 10 November 1884".

What was the cathedral of the archdiocese of Carthage, the Saint Louis Cathedral (Carthage), is owned by the Tunisian state and is used for concerts.

=== Diocese ===
The prelature was elevated to an exempt diocese, directly subject to the Holy See, in 1995. (Note: Although 1983 CIC canon 431 § 2 states that "[a]s a rule, exempt dioceses are no longer to exist", this case, according to 1983 CIC canon 3, is an exception that must conform to agreements such as the 1964 modus vivendi.) In 2010, it was promoted to an exempt archdiocese. The summary of the history of the residential archdiocese of Tunis now given in the Annuario Pontificio is: "archbishopric under the name of Carthage 10 November 1884; Prelature of Tunis 9 July 1964; diocese 31 May 1995; archbishopric 22 May 2010." The ancient see of Carthage, on the other hand, being no longer a residential bishopric, is listed by the Catholic Church as a titular see in the same publication as distinct from the modern see of Tunis. As a summary history of the titular see of Carthage it states: "founded in the 3rd century, metropolitan see of Proconsularis or Zeugitana, restored as an archiepiscopal see on 10 November 1884, titular metropolitan see 9 July 1964".

== Ordinaries ==
=== Apostolic Vicars of Tunis ===
- Fidèle Sutter, OFMCap (5 July 1844 – 28 June 1881)
  - Charles Lavigerie (apostolic administrator 1881–1884) (Cardinal in 1882)
  - Francesco Maria Rueda (Coadjutor Apostolic Vicar: 1882–1884)
- Spiridion-Salvatore-Costantino Buhadgiar, OFMCap (12 August 1884 – 20 November 1884)

=== Archbishops of Carthage ===
- Cardinal Charles Lavigerie (10 November 1884 – 26 November 1892)
- Barthélemy Clément Combes (16 June 1893 – 20 February 1922)
  - Alexis Lemaître, M. Afr. (Coadjutor Archbishop: 28 July 1920 – 20 February 1922)
- Alexis Lemaître, M. Afr. (20 February 1922 – 16 May 1939)
  - Charles-Albert Gounot, CM (Coadjutor Archbishop: 14 Aug 1937 – 16 May 1939)
- Charles-Albert Gounot, CM (16 May 1939 – 20 June 1953)
- Maurice Perrin (29 October 1953 – 9 July 1964)

=== Territorial Prelates of Tunis ===
- Michel Callens, M. Afr. (9 Jan 1965 – 19 August 1990)
- Fouad Twal (30 May 1992 – 31 May 1995)

=== Bishops of Tunis ===
- Fouad Twal (31 May 1995 – 8 September 2005); Archbishop (personal title)
- Maroun Elias Nimeh Lahham (8 September 2005 – 22 May 2010)

=== Archbishops of Tunis ===
- Maroun Elias Nimeh Lahham (22 May 2010 – 19 January 2012)
- Ilario Antoniazzi (21 February 2013 – )
- Nicolas Lhernould (4 April 2024 – present)

=== Auxiliary bishops ===
- Félix-Jules-Xavier Jourdan de la Passardière, CO (1887 – February 1892)
- Jules-Étienne Gazaniol (26 February 1892 – 3 December 1896)
- Jean-Joseph Tournier (26 February 1892 – 28 June 1924)
- Spiridion Poloméni (26 February 1892 – 12 September 1930)
- Jean Saint-Pierre (28 May 1930 – August 1937)
- Paul-Marie-Maurice Perrin (7 June 1947 – 29 October 1953)

=== Other priest of this diocese who became bishop ===
- Nicolas Pierre Jean Lhernould, appointed Bishop of Constantine (-Hippone), Algeria in 2019

== See also ==
- Diocesan Library of Tunis
- Catholic Church in Tunisia
- Muslim conquest of the Maghreb
- Archdiocese of Carthage
- Catholic Church in Africa
