= Fouad Twal =

Jordanian Catholic bishop (born 1940)

His Beatitude: Fouad Twal; البطريرك فؤاد طوال
- Patriarch Emeritus of Jerusalem of the Latins
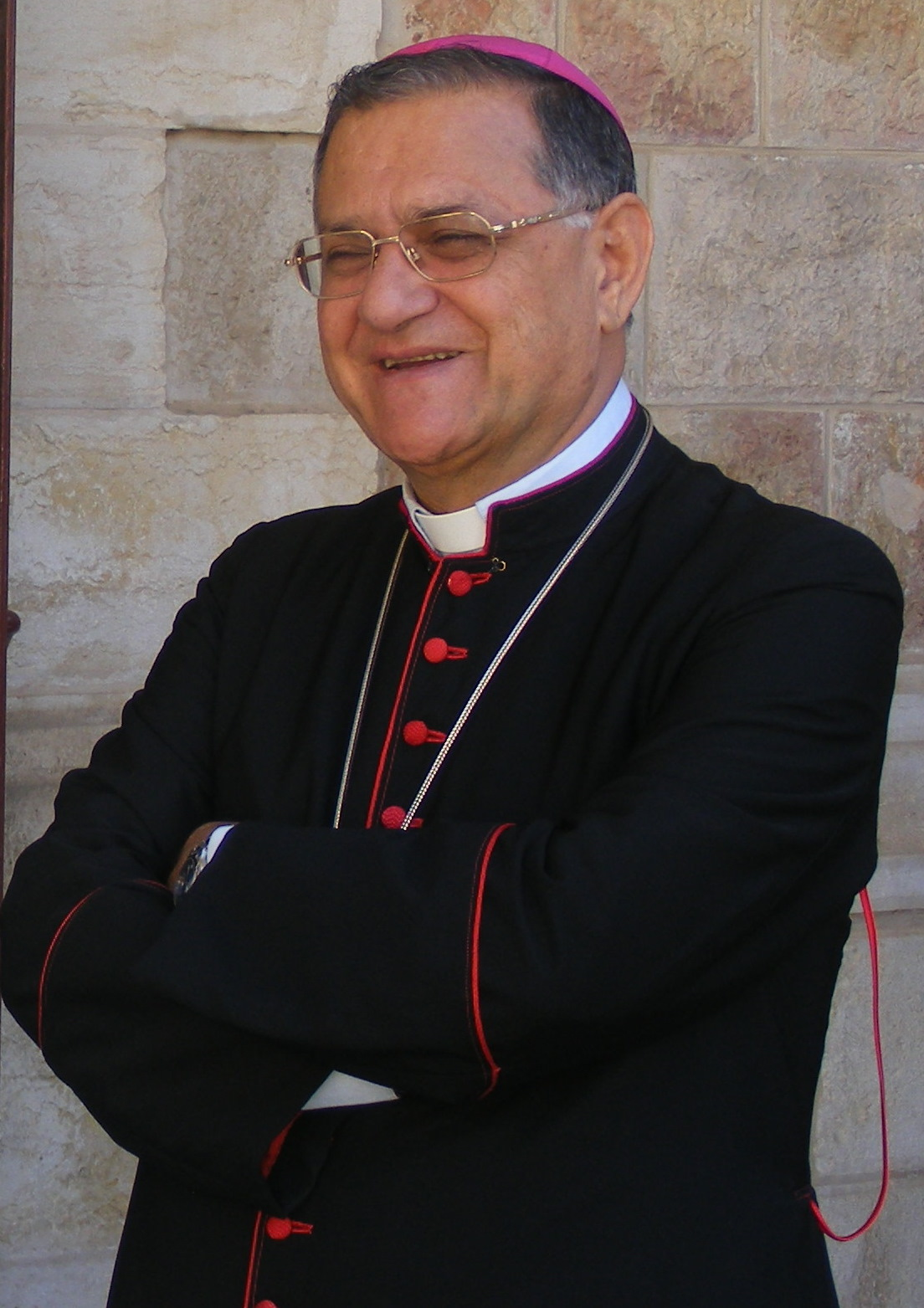
- Archdiocese: Jerusalem
- Province: Jerusalem
- See: Jerusalem
- Appointed: 8 September 2005 (Coadjutor)
- Installed: 22 June 2008
- Term ended: 24 June 2016
- Predecessor: Michel Sabbah
- Successor: Pierbattista Pizzaballa
- Other posts: President of the Conference of Latin Bishops of the Arab Regions; President of the Assembly of Catholic Ordinaries of the Holy Land; Grand Prior of the Knights of the Equestrian Order of the Holy Sepulchre
- Previous posts: Prelate of Tunis (1992–1995); Archbishop of Tunis (1995–2005)

Orders
- Ordination: 29 June 1966
- Consecration: 22 July 1992 by Michel Sabbah

Personal details
- Born: 23 October 1940 (age 86) Madaba, Emirate of Transjordan (present-day Jordan)
- Denomination: Roman Catholic
- Motto: Paratum cor meum My heart is ready (Psalm 107)
- Coat of arms

Styles of Patriarch Fouad Twal
- Reference style: His Beatitude
- Spoken style: Your Beatitude
- Religious style: Monsignor
- Posthumous style: n/a

Fouad Twal (Arabic: البطريرك فؤاد طوال; born 23 October 1940 in Madaba, Jordan) is a Jordanian Catholic prelate who served as Latin Patriarch of Jerusalem from 2008 to 2016. He has also served as the Grand Prior of the Equestrian Order of the Holy Sepulchre of Jerusalem and President for the Assembly of Catholic Ordinaries of the Holy Land.

== Biography ==
Fouad Twal was ordained to the priesthood on 29 June 1966. After his ordination he was the vicar of Ramallah. In 1972 he entered the Pontifical Lateran University where he studied for a doctorate in canon law, which he was awarded in 1975. He was appointed the prelate of the territorial prelature of Tunis by Pope John Paul II on 30 May 1992. He was consecrated to the episcopate on 22 July later that year by principal consecrator Patriarch Michel Sabbah. On 31 May 1995, Pope John Paul II gave the Tunis territorial prelature diocesan status, creating the Diocese of Tunis, and appointed Twal who was made an archbishop ad personam. In 2005, Pope Benedict XVI named him the coadjutor archbishop-patriarch of the Latin Patriarchate of Jerusalem; he succeeded Michel Sabbah as the Patriarch on 21 June 2008 and was enthroned Jerusalem's Church of the Holy Sepulchre the next day. A week later, he received the pallium from the hands of Pope Benedict XVI at a Mass in Rome's Basilica of Saint Peter.

In 2008, he explained his understanding of the situation of Israel and the Palestinian Territories and their people: "We receive a lot of help and we are grateful but at the same time we say we need more. What we need is peace. We don’t only want to be a begging Church, we don't want to be beggars with a licence. I don't like this. We need a political horizon, it's time to put an end to the Wall, the Checkpoints, it's time for a Palestinian State, it's time for an end to our problems with visas."

On 19 February 2014 he was appointed a member of the Congregation for the Oriental Churches.

In June 2016 Pope Francis accepted Twal's resignation as patriarch.

== Additional positions ==
- Grand Prior of the Equestrian Order of the Holy Sepulchre of Jerusalem
- President ex officio of the Assembly of Catholic Ordinaries of the Holy Land
- President ex officio of the Conference of Latin Bishops of the Arab Regions
- member, Council of Catholic Patriarchs of the East
- member of the following dicastery of the Roman Curia
  - Congregation for the Oriental Churches
  - Pontifical Council for the Family

== Honours ==
- Knight of the Collar of the Order of the Holy Sepulchre (Catholic) (Equestrian Order of the Holy Sepulchre of Jerusalem; Automatically as Catholic Patriarch of Jerusalem)
- Star of the Order of Jerusalem (Palestine)
- Grand Cross of the Order of the Star of Italy
- Grand Cross of the Order of Merit (Portugal)
- Grand Officer of the Legion of Honour (France)

== Gallery ==
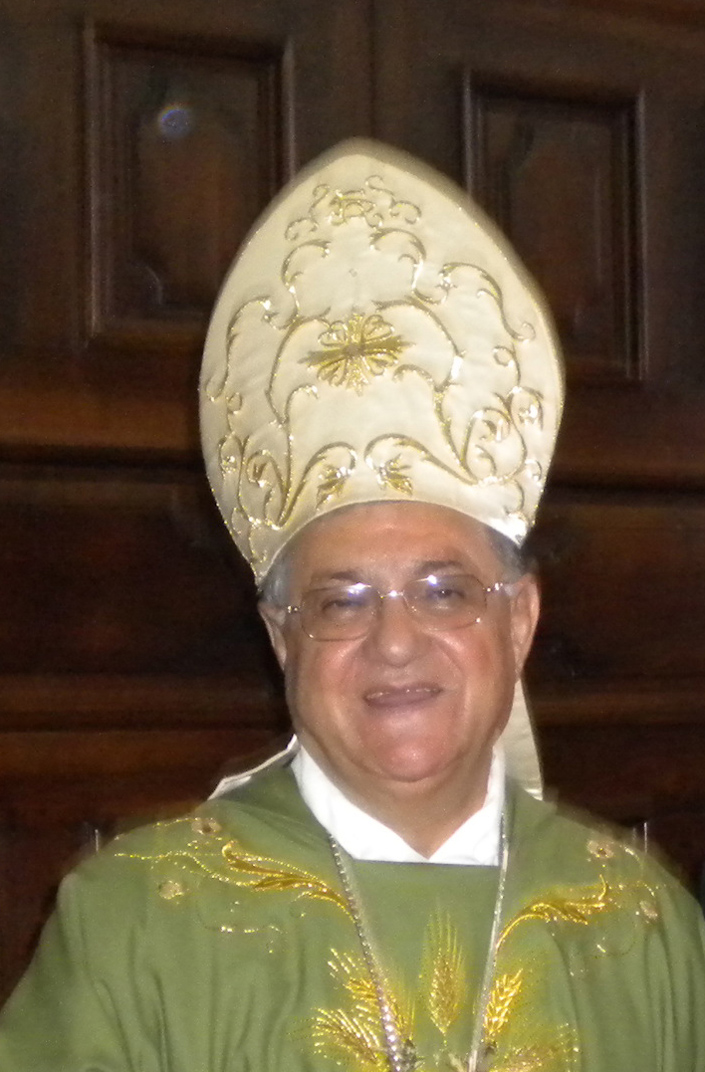
Patriarch Twal in 2009.

== See also ==
- Christianity in Jordan
- Latin Patriarchs of Jerusalem

Catholic Church titles
Preceded by Michel Callens	Prelate of Tunis; 1992–1995	Succeeded by himself as Bishop of Tunis
Preceded by himself as Prelate of Tunis	Bishop of Tunis; 1995–2005	Succeeded by Maroun Elias Nimeh Lahham
Preceded by Michel Sabbah	Latin Patriarch of Jerusalem; 2008–2016	Vacant Sede vacante Title next held by Pierbattista Pizzaballa
