= Acropolium of Carthage =

Latin Catholic church in Tunisia

Acropolium of Carthage Cathédrale Saint-Louis de Carthage
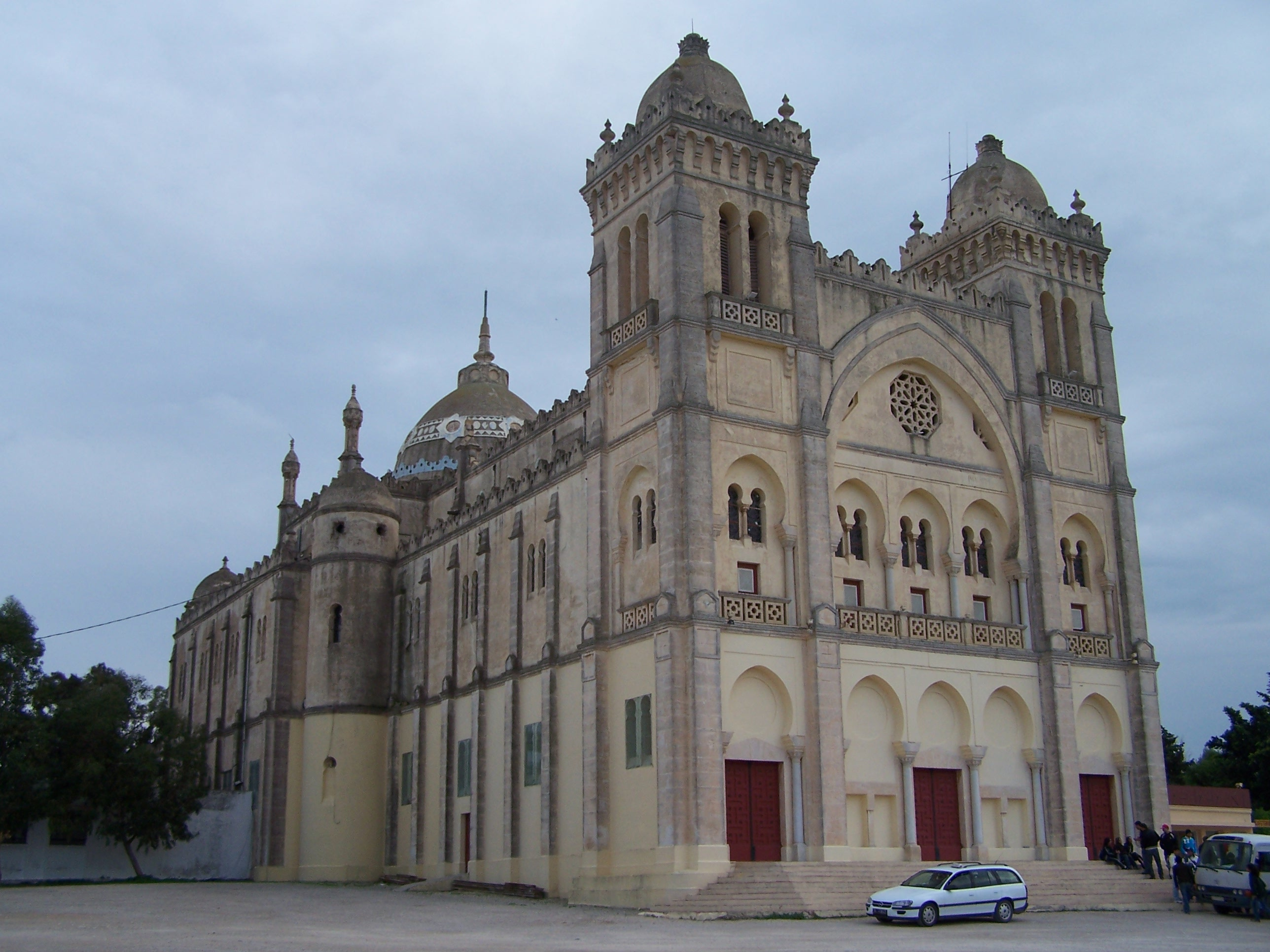
- Acropolium of Carthage

Religion
- Affiliation: Latin Church
- Province: Archdiocese of Tunis
- Ecclesiastical or organisational status: Cathedral
- Leadership: Agostino Casaroli (1967-1979)
- Year consecrated: 1884; 142 years ago
- Status: Inactive

Location
- Location: Carthage, Tunis
- Country: Tunisia
- Interactive map of Acropolium of Carthage; Cathédrale Saint-Louis de Carthage
- Coordinates: 36.853784°N 10.323356°E

Architecture
- Architect: Joseph Pougnet
- Type: church
- Style: Byzantine architecture; Moorish architecture
- Groundbreaking: 1884
- Completed: 1890

The Acropolium, also known as Saint Louis Cathedral (French: Cathédrale Saint-Louis de Carthage), is a former Latin Catholic church located in Carthage, Tunisia.

The cathedral sits on the peak of Byrsa Hill, near the ruins of the ancient Punic and then Roman city. It was built atop the ruins of an old temple dedicated to Eshmun, the Punic god of healing. The edifice can still be accessed from the basement.

Since 1993, the cathedral has been known as the "Acropolium". It is no longer used for worship, but instead hosts public events or concerts of Tunisian music and classical music. Currently, the only Roman Catholic cathedral operating in Tunisia is the Cathedral of St. Vincent de Paul in Tunis.

== History ==
Hussein II Bey authorised the French consul-general to build a cathedral on the site of ancient Carthage, to determine where it would be situated, and to take all the land necessary for the project. His words were:

We cede in perpetuity to His Majesty the King of France a location in the kingdom, sufficient to raise a religious monument in honour of King Louis IX at the place where this prince died. We commit ourselves to respect and to make respected this monument consecrated by the King of France to the memory of one of his most illustrious ancestors.

The consul charged his son Jules with this duty, who concluded that the chapel ought to be built on Byrsa Hill, in the centre of the Punic acropolis, where the temple of Aesculapius was once located. Descendants of crusaders' families, companions of the sovereign, helped finance the construction.

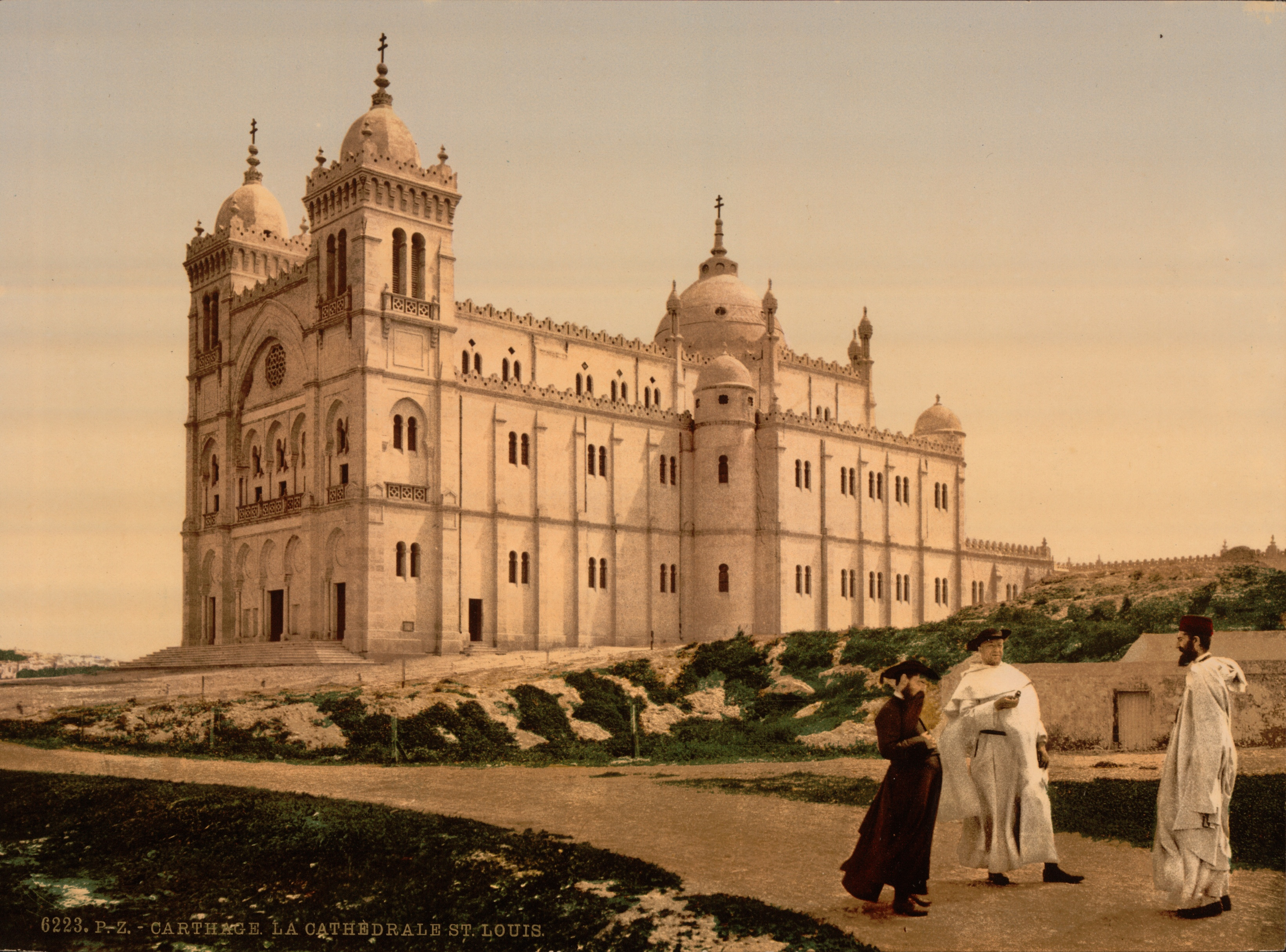
St. Louis Cathedral in 1899

Built between 1884 and 1890, under the French protectorate, the cathedral acquired primacy for all of Africa when the title of primate of Africa was restored for the benefit of Cardinal Lavigerie, titular of the Archdioceses of Algiers and of Carthage, united in his person. The building was consecrated with great pomp in the presence of numerous ecclesiastical dignitaries. Cardinal Lavigerie dedicated the church to Saint Louis, who died on that approximate spot during the Eighth Crusade in 1270.

After his death in 1892, Cardinal Lavigerie was buried there and a funerary monument was erected in his memory. However, his body now lies in the General Curia of the White Fathers, in Rome.

In 1964, the Modus Vivendi—a bilateral treaty between Tunisia and the Catholic Church—ceded almost all of the Church's real estate holdings to the Tunisian state, including the Acropolium. The space has been a cultural centre since 1992.

== Architecture ==
Late 19th century French architecture tended to feature composite styles (as in the case of the Basilica of the Sacré Cœur in Paris, built in the Romanesque-Byzantine architectural tradition in the same era). The building, constructed according to the plans of the abbot Pougnet, is inspired by Byzantine, Gothic, and Moorish architectural style, and is in the shape of a Latin cross of 65 meters by 30. The façade is framed by two square towers, the crossing lies beneath a large cupola surrounded by eight short towers or spires, and there is a smaller cupola above the apse.

The church contains a nave and two aisles separated by arches passing above. The ceiling beams are sculpted, painted and gilt with arabesques. The church has 284 stained glass windows.

The church is home to artefacts, such as a monument in onyx holding the reliquary of Saint Louis, and mosaics of Saint Cyprien. Its great bell weighs six tons and there is a four-bell carillon as well. A cross, the only one standing at that time in Tunisia, tops the building.

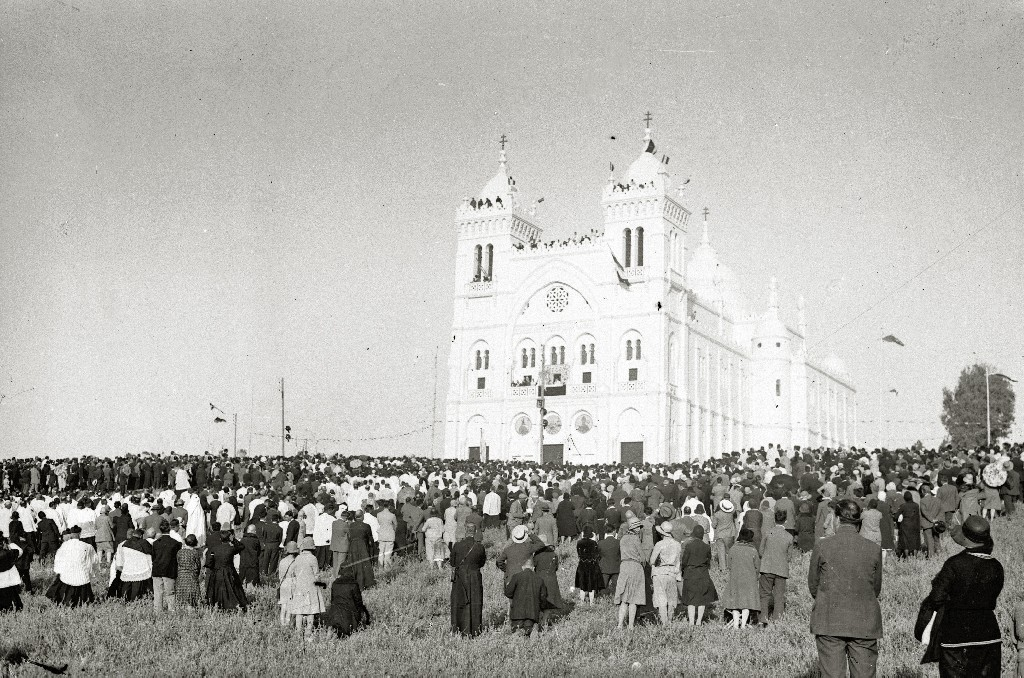
Cathedral during the XXX Eucharistic Congress (1930)

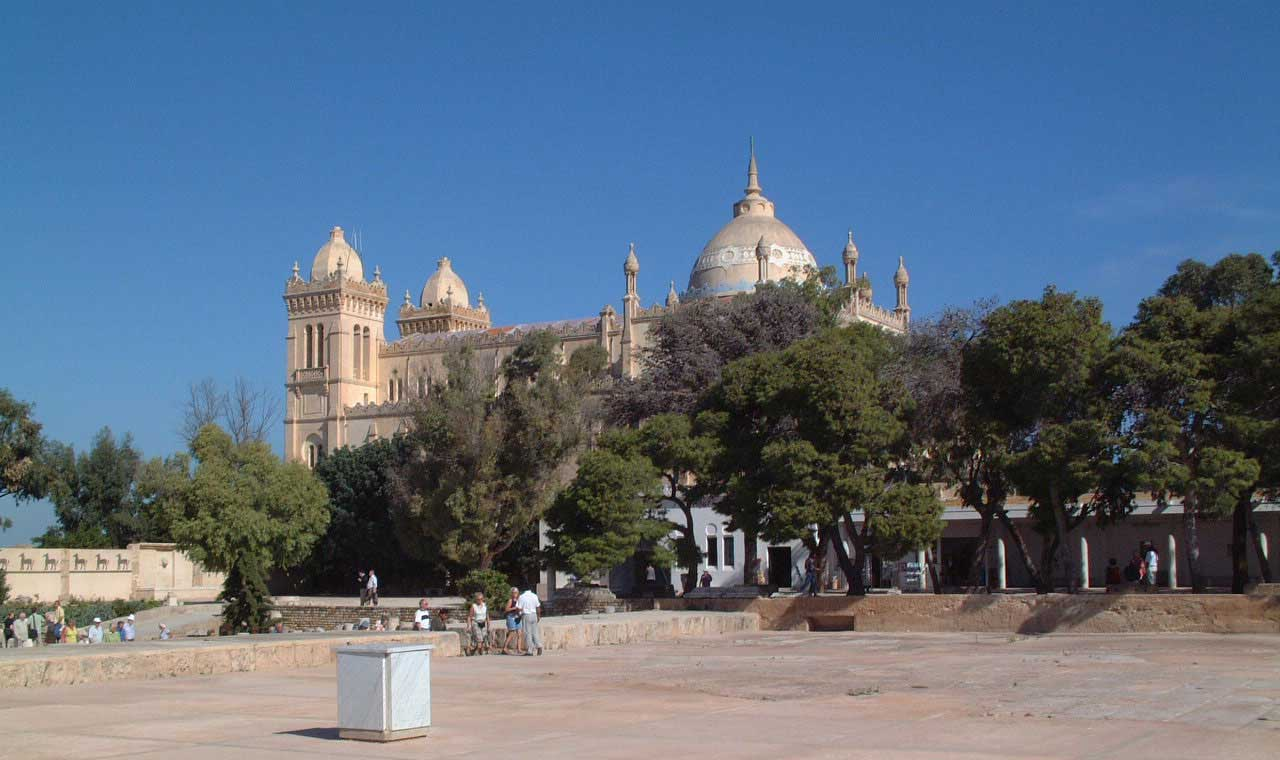
Side view

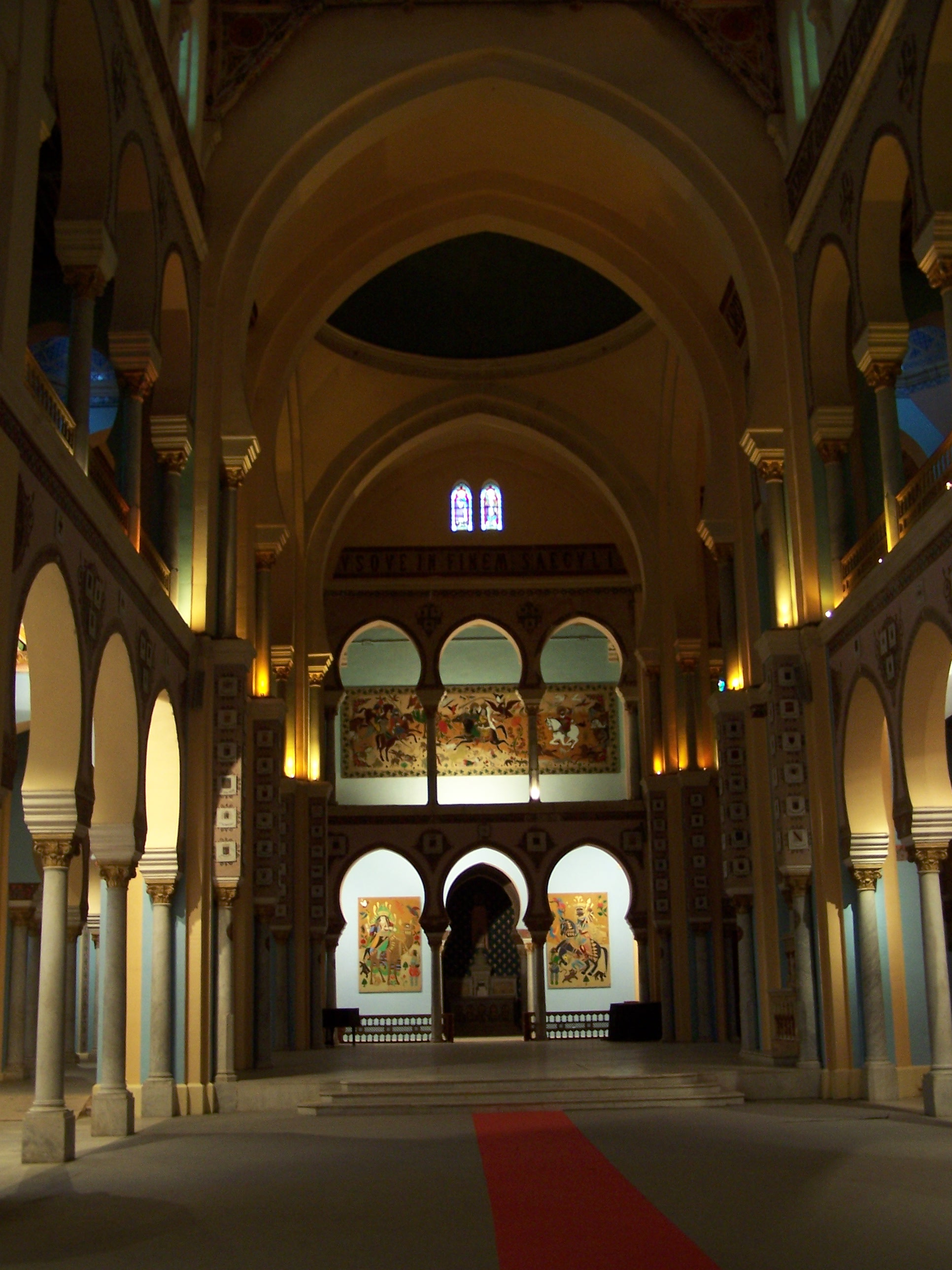
Nave
