= Byrsa =

Citadel above ancient Carthage's harbour

Coordinates: 36°51′08″N 10°19′26″E

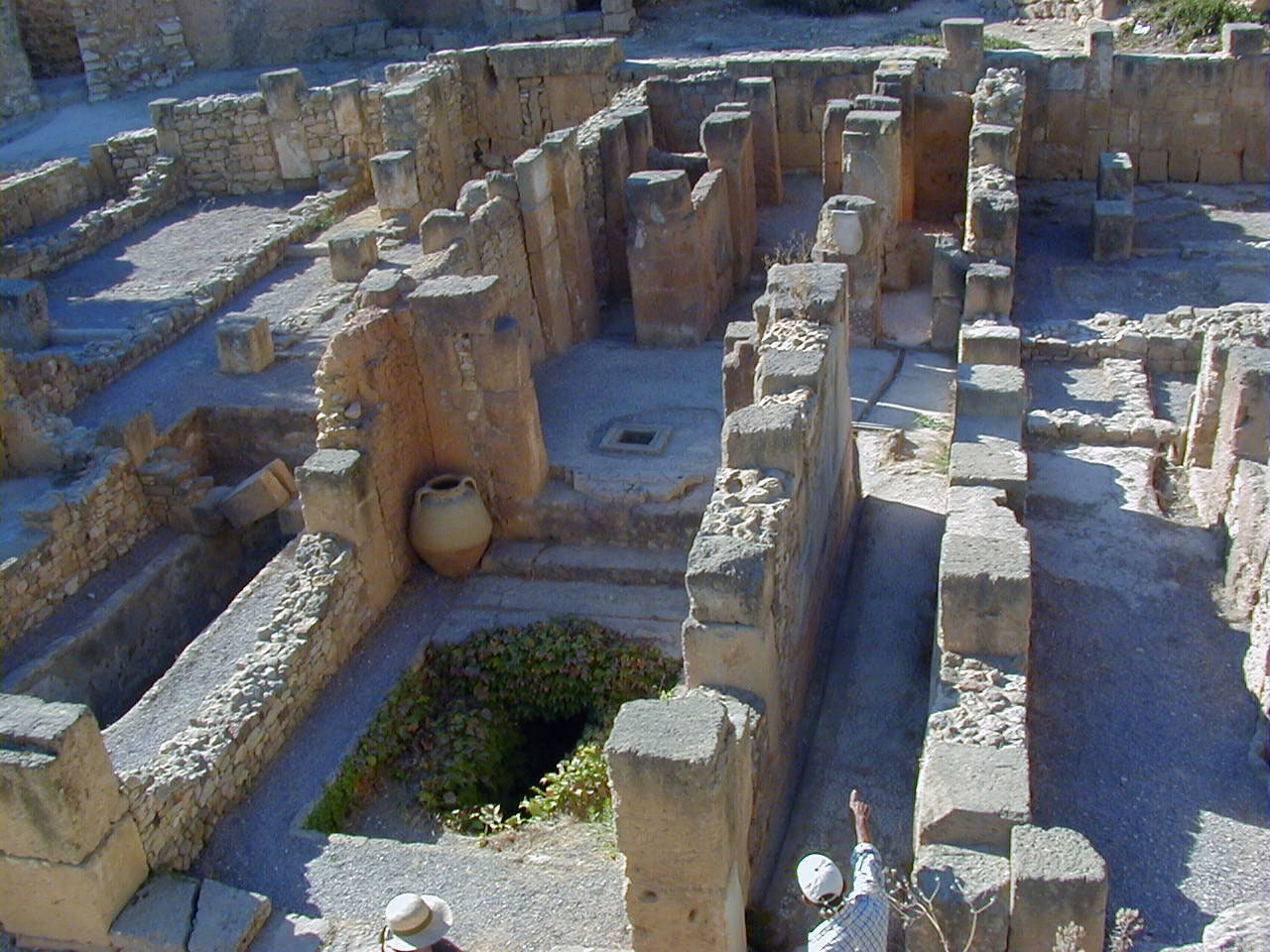
District of Punic Byrsa

Byrsa was a walled citadel above the Phoenician harbour in ancient Carthage, Tunisia, as well as the name of the hill it rested on.

== Legend ==
In Virgil's account of Dido's founding of Carthage, when Dido and her party were encamped at Byrsa, the local Berber chieftain offered them as much land as could be covered with a single oxhide. Therefore, Dido cut an oxhide into tiny strips and set them on the ground end to end until she had completely encircled the hilltop of Byrsa (Ancient Greek: βύρσα, "oxhide").

== History ==
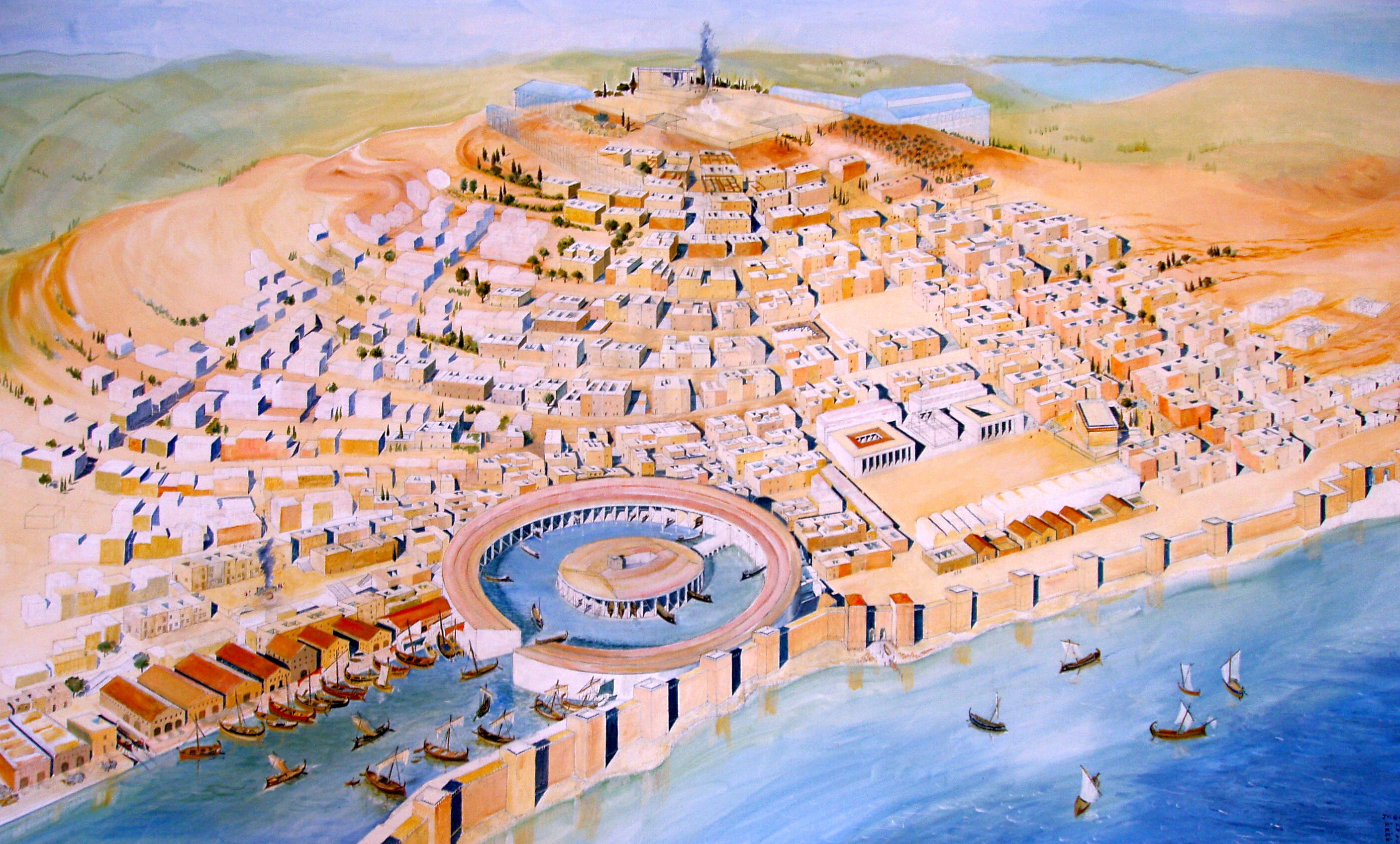
Modern reconstruction of Punic Carthage. The circular harbor at the front is the Cothon, the military port of Carthage, where all of Carthage's warships (Biremes) were anchored.

The citadel dominated the city below and formed the principal military installation of Carthage. Its name appeared on Carthaginian currency under the form 𐤁𐤀𐤓𐤏𐤕 (bʾrʿt).

It was besieged by Scipio Aemilianus Africanus in the Third Punic War when the city was defeated and destroyed in 146 BCE. The Byrsa citadel was the seat of the proconsul of Africa within the Roman Empire. In 439 CE, Geiseric took possession of Carthage. The Vandal–Alan kings ruled North Africa from the Byrsa until the Byzantine emperor Justinian reconquered the province in 533. Referring to the supposed origin of the Vandals and Alans in the Caucasus and their ongoing naval raids against the Byzantine empire, the contemporary poet Sidonius Apollinaris bemoaned that "the natural order hath been reversed, and now parched Byrsa launches against me the frenzy of the Caucasus."

St Louis Cathedral was built on Byrsa Hill starting in 1884, atop an ancient temple. Today, it serves as a cultural centre. Byrsa Hill itself is part of the archaeological site of Carthage. In addition to a cathedral monument, the Carthage National Museum was erected atop it.

== Archaeology ==
The tomb of the Young Man of Byrsa

In 1994, the body of an ancient Carthaginian individual was excavated from a 2500-year-old Punic tomb in Byrsa Hill. In 2016, he was found to belong to the rare U5b2c1 maternal haplogroup. The Young Man of Byrsa specimen dates from the late 6th century BC, and his lineage is believed to represent early gene flow from Iberia to the Maghreb.
