= Maroun Elias Nimeh Lahham =

21st-century Roman Catholic archbishop

His Excellency Maroun Elias Nimeh Lahham
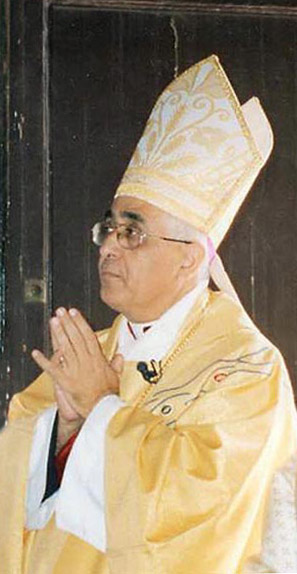

Orders
- Ordination: 24 June 1972
- Consecration: 8 September 2005

Personal details
- Born: 20 July 1948 (age 77) Irbid, Jordan
- Denomination: Roman Catholic Church
- Motto: UT COGNOSCANT TE (So that they may know you)
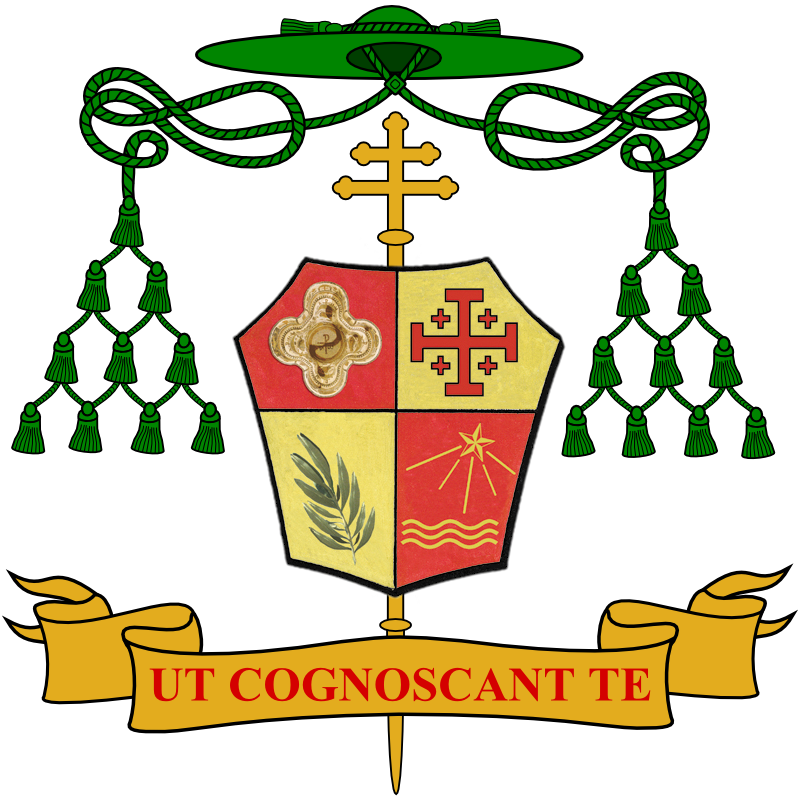
- Coat of arms

Maroun Elias Nimeh Lahham (Arabic: مارون إلياس نعمة لحام; born 20 July 1948, Irbid, Jordan) is a Jordanian Catholic prelate who served as the first Bishop of Tunis from 2005 to 2010, and the first Archbishop of Tunis from 2010 to 2012. He later served as the Patriarchal Vicar to Jordan of the Latin Patriarchate of Jerusalem from 2012 until his retirement in 2017.

== Biography ==
On 24 June 1972 Lahham was ordained a Catholic priest in Jerusalem. He later became Fidei donum in Dubai and vicar and priest in Jordan.

In 1992, Lahham received his PhD in pastoral theology and catechesis in the Pontifical Lateran University. In 1994, he was appointed rector of the Latin Seminary in Beit Jala.

On 8 September 2005 Lahham was appointed Bishop of Tunis by Pope Benedict XVI and was ordained on 2 October that year in the parish church of Beit Jala by Latin Patriarch of Jerusalem, Michel Sabbah.

On 22 May 2010 Pope Benedict XVI raised the Diocese of Tunis to an Archdiocese and gave to Lahham the title of Archbishop of Tunis.

Less than two years later, on 19 January 2012, Lahham was recalled to the Middle East where he became Auxiliary Bishop and vicar of the Latin Patriarchate of Jerusalem for Jordan. He received the title of Titular bishop of Madaba and maintained, as an individual, the dignity of archbishop.

On 6 February 2017 Pope Francis accepted the resignation of Lahham as Auxiliary Bishop of Jordan.

== Distinctions ==
- Commander of the Sacred Military Constantinian Order of Saint George
