= Stele of the Priest =

4th - 3rd century BC Carthaginian stele

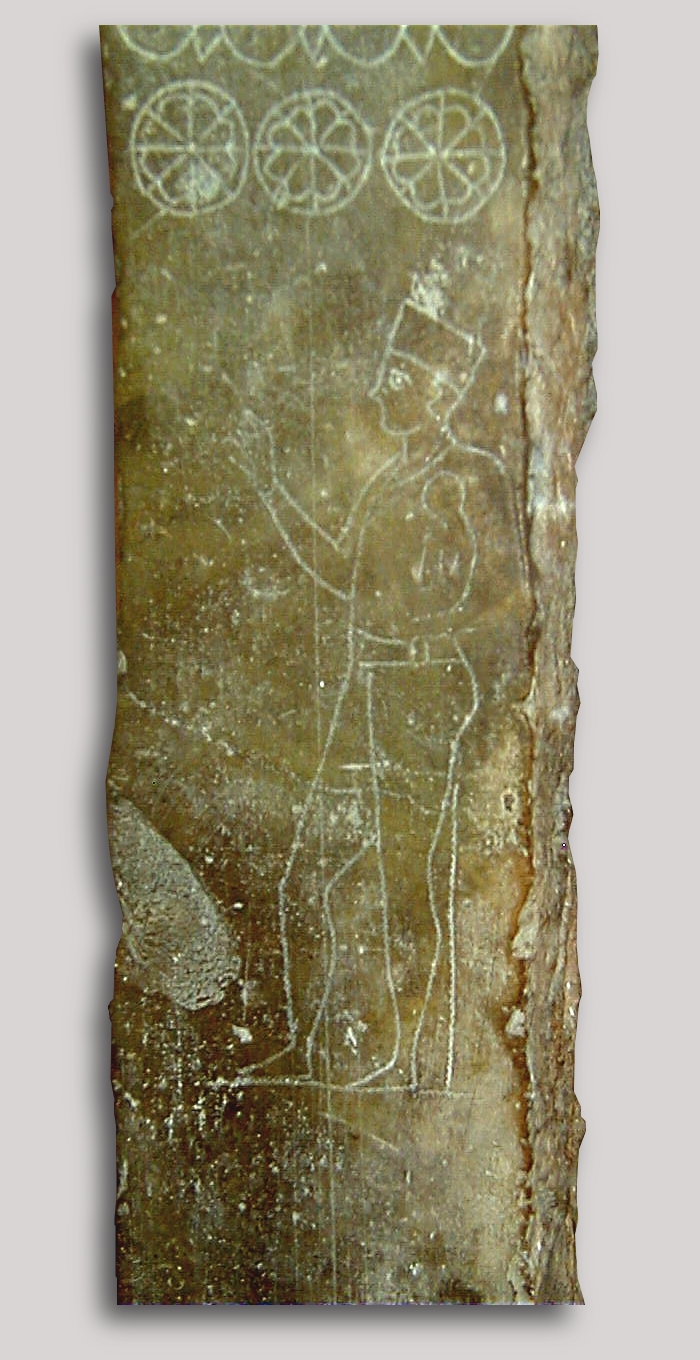
- The central section of the stele.
- Type: Stele
- Material: Limestone
- Size: 118–120 cm (46.5–47.2 in) tall 12 cm (4.7 in) thick
- Created: Late 4th - early 3rd century BC
- Discovered: 1921; Carthage tophet Carthage, Tunisia
- Present location: Bardo National Museum; Tunis, Tunisia
- Identification: cb. 229 (archive)
- Culture: Ancient Carthage

The Stele of the Priest, also known as the Stele of the Priest and the Child, is a 4th - 3rd century BC limestone stele that was discovered at the Carthage tophet in 1921 in modern-day Tunisia. It is currently housed at the Bardo National Museum in Tunis.

Interpreted as depicting a priest holding a child in his arms, the stele has fueled a debate on whether or not the Punic people practised ritual child sacrifice, a question that is still not settled among specialists in Carthaginian civilization.

== History ==
=== Carthage tophet ===
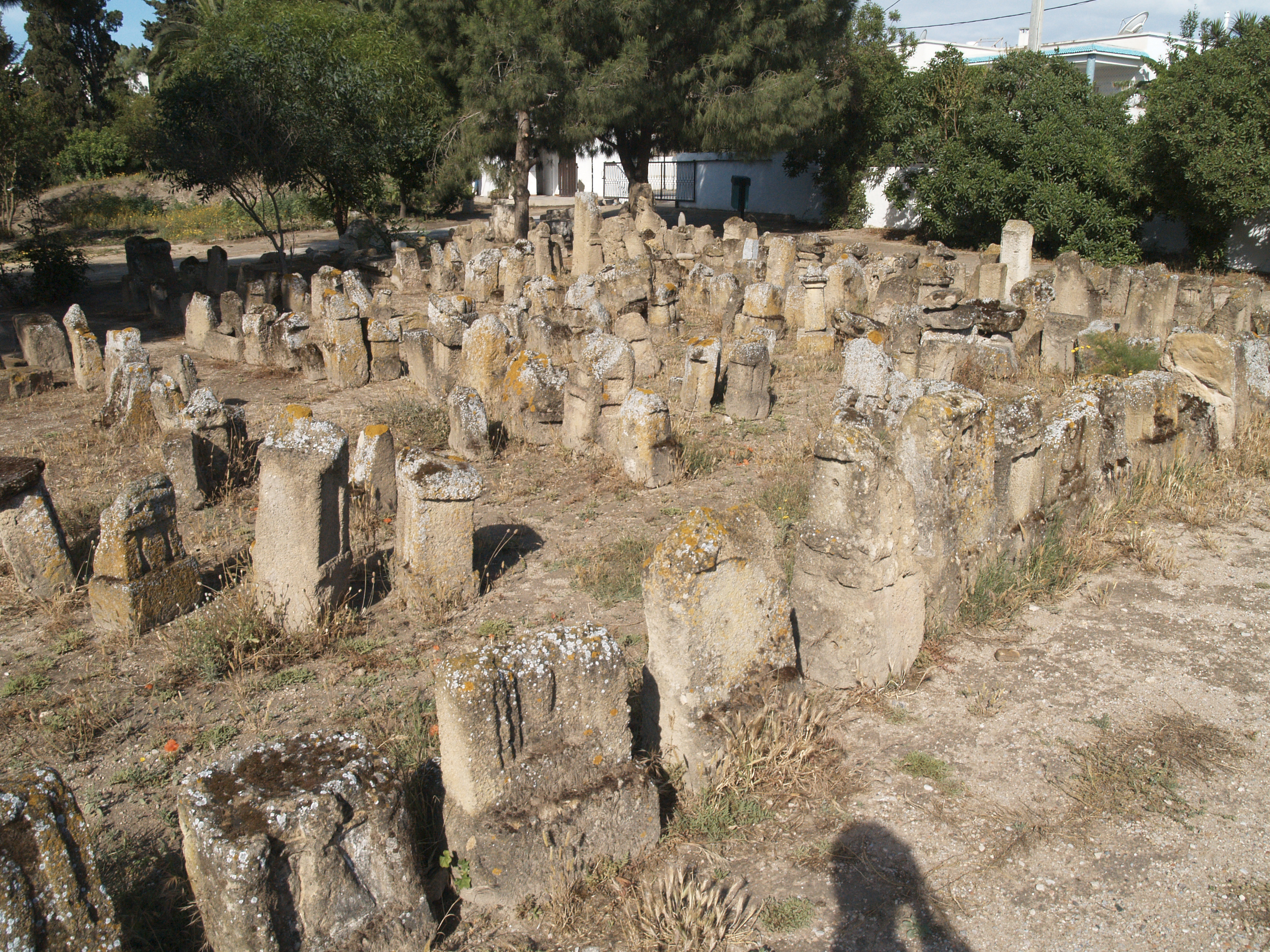
A general view of the Carthage tophet.

"Tophet" is a term in the Hebrew Bible that refers to an open-air sanctuary in Jerusalem where worshippers were traditionally engaged in sacrifices to the god Moloch. However, in archaeological research about the Phoenician civilization, "tophet" refers to a sacred place that is dedicated to the chief god Ba'al Hammon, the goddess Tanit, or both. In each tophet, which were scattered throughout sites in the central Mediterranean that were associated with the Phoenician diaspora, there were a great number of urns with cremated human or animal remains in them, particularly of infants. These urns were accompanied with a betyl, a cippus, or a stele, all of which were used to mark the location of the deceased and indicate sacrifice to the gods if they had inscriptions; sometimes, they may be accompanied with jewelry.

In the city of Carthage, these urns and stelae were primarily concentrated in the Carthage tophet, with estimates that it had up to 20,000 tombs between 400 and 200 BC. In terms of iconography and variety of forms, the stelae at the tophet was described as seeming "to differ from Eastern practice". However, in 146 BC, as Carthage was besieged and destroyed by the Roman Republic by the end of the Third Punic War, these stelae became scattered throughout the archaeological site of Carthage.

Starting in 1817, archaeologists began noticing these stelae and began an effort to retrieve large numbers of them for further research. These stelae were often found by various means, with the most common being clandestine, illegal excavations. These extractions peaked during the 1870s, when French diplomat Jean-Baptiste Evariste Charles Pricot de Sainte-Marie found more than 2000 stelae in Carthage, though the majority of them were unable to be retrieved as they were later loaded on the French ironclad Magenta, which exploded and sunk in 1875. Ultimately, this increased archaeological attention to Carthage led to the 1921 discovery of the Carthage tophet, and later of the Stele of the Priest.

=== Discovery and dating of the stele ===
The Stele of the Priest was unearthed in December 1921 by a Tunisian stonedigger during these illegal excavations, before being acquired by François Icard, a police inspector in Tunis and amateur archaeologist, and Paul Gielly, a municipal official in Carthage. It is now hosted at the Bardo National Museum in Tunis.

== Description ==
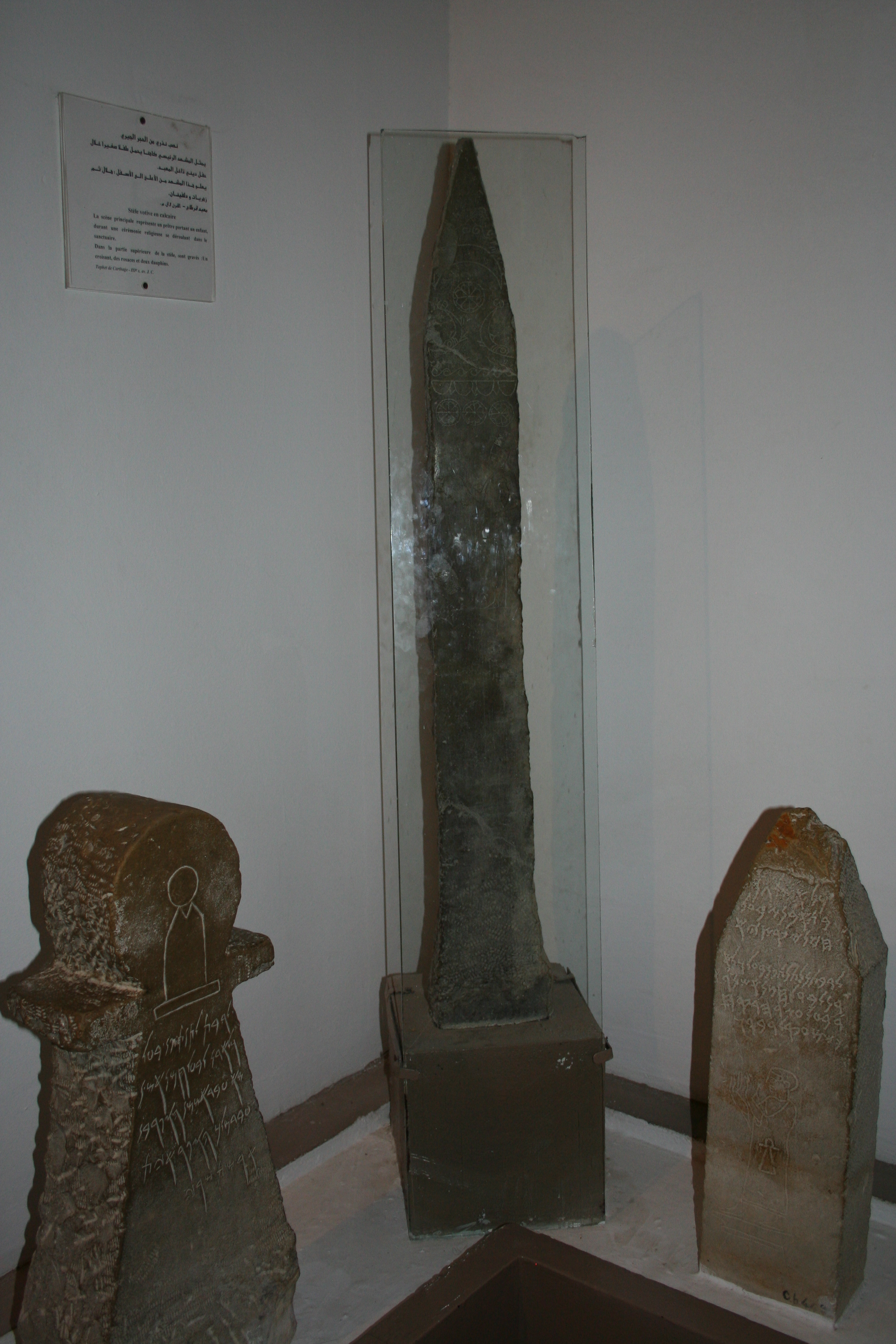
The full stele at the Bardo National Museum, Tunis. Photo taken in 2008.

The Stele of the Priest is a grey-blue obelisk made out of limestone sourced from the region of Carthage, with estimates of its height being between 118 centimetres (46 in) and 120 centimetres (47 in), and is 12 centimetres (4.7 in) thick. Its left side is damaged, and there are no visible inscriptions of the Phoenician script.

The upper section of the stele presents a variety of iconographic motifs, many of which relate directly to Carthaginian religion, with a crescent moon, representing the goddess Tanit, and two opposing dolphins, representing the celestial ocean. The crescent moon itself is between two S-shaped scrolls "that resemble wings" and an eight-petal rosette. Moving down, there is a frieze marked with waves, an egg-and-dart pattern, and three additional rosettes.

The main subjects of the stele are the priest and the child being held by him, as seen in the central section. More specifically, it depicts the left profile of a barefoot male adult wearing a flat tiara, an indicator that he is a kohanim, or Punic-Achaemenid priest, and a tunic, with edges marked by lines at the neck and around the wrist, being held by a belt. The tunic is likely made out of linen, as it was used as a garment by other priests in the Ancient Near East. On his forearm, there is a twisted bracelet. The priest's right foot is forward, while the right hand is raised in a gesture of prayer or blessing. His mouth, unlike the eyes, nose, and ears, isn't depicted in the stele. With his left arm, he holds a child, estimated to be two or three years old, and is "barely sketched".

Regarding the positioning, unlike the sole rosette above, the priest and the child appear off-centre, being placed further towards the right. This technique, even when it was on a narrow stele, created a sense of space, with both figures likely facing towards Tanit and their altar.

== Bibliography ==
- Bonnet, Corinne (2011). Gruen, Erich Stephen (ed.). On Gods and Earth : The Tophet and the Construction of a New identity in Punic Carthage. Cultural identity in the ancient Mediterranean. pp. 373–387. ISBN 978-0-89236-969-0.
- Quinn, Josephin Crawley (2011). Gruen, Erich Stephen (ed.). The Cultures of the Tophet: Identification and Identity in the Phoenician Diaspora. Cultural identity in the ancient Mediterranean. pp. 388–413. ISBN 978-0-89236-969-0.
- Beschaouch, Azedine (2001). La légende de Carthage [The legend of Carthage]. Découvertes Gallimard / Archéologie (in French). Vol. 172. Éditions Gallimard. ISBN 2-07-053212-7.
- Bénichou-Safar, Hélène (2007). "Iconologie générale et iconographie carthaginois" [Carthaginian general iconology and iconography]. Antiquités africaines (in French) 43: 5–46. Archived from the original on 2026-07-04.
- Bénichou-Safar, Hélène (1995). "Les fouilles du tophet de Salammbô à Carthage (première partie)". Antiquités africaines (31): 81–199. Archived from the original on 2026-07-04.
- Lancel, Serge (1992). Carthage. Paris: Fayard. ISBN 978-2-213-02838-5.
- Lancel, Serge (1995). "La fouille de l'épave du Magenta et le sauvetage de sa cargaison archéologique" [The excavation of the wreck of the Magenta and the recovery of its archaeological cargo]. Comptes rendus des séances de l'Académie des Inscriptions et Belles-Lettres (in French). 139 (3): 813–816. doi:10.3406/crai.1995.15521.
- Slim, Hédi; Mahjoubi, Ammar; Belkhodja, Khaled; Ennabli, Abdelmajid (2003). Histoire générale de la Tunisie [General history of Tunisia] (in French). ISBN 978-2706816956.
- Slim, Hédi; Fauqué, Nicolas (2001). La Tunisie antique : de Hannibal à saint Augustin [Ancient Tunisia: from Hannibal to saint Augustine] (in French). ISBN 978-2856204214.
- Poinssot, Louis; Lantier, Robert (1923). "Un sanctuaire de Tanit à Carthage" [A sanctuary of Tanit in Cartahge]. Revue de l'histoire des religions (in French): 32–68.
- Fantar, M'hamed Hassine; Aounallah, Samir; Daoulatli, Abdelaziz (2015). Le Bardo, la grande histoire de la Tunisie : musée, sites et monuments [The Bardo, the grand history of Tunisia: Museums, sites, and monuments] (in French). Tunis. ISBN 978-9938958119.
- Hours, Madeleine (1951). Les représentations figurées sur les stèles de Carthage [Figure representations in Carthaginian steles] (in French). Cahiers de Byrsa. OCLC 494270692.
