= Carthage tophet =

Ancient sacred area in Tunisia

Carthage Tophet
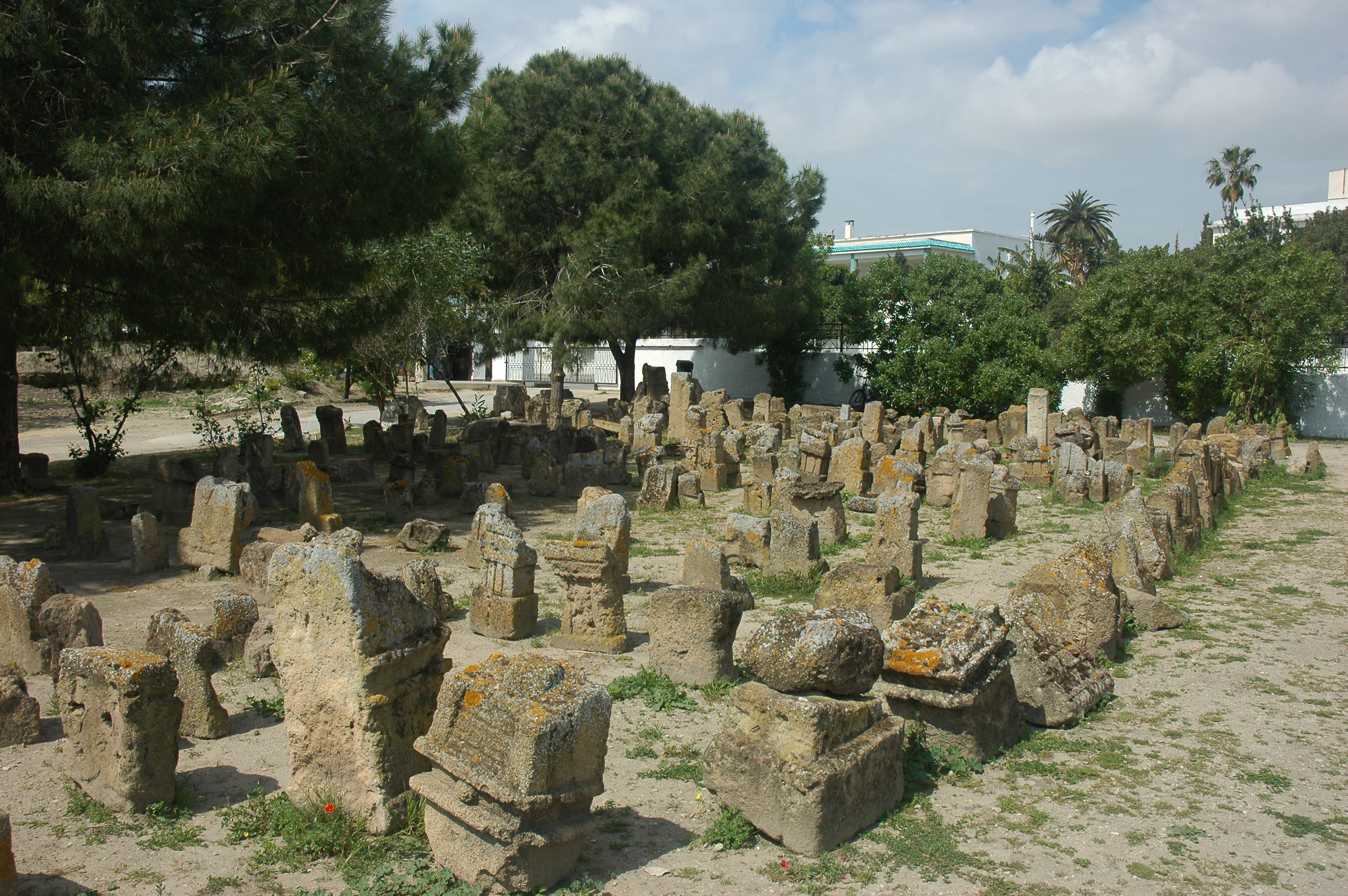
- Current presentation of the tophet: stelae and cippes in El Haouaria sandstone.
- Interactive map of Carthage Tophet
- Type: Ancient sacred area Cemetery
- Location: Carthage, Tunis, Tunisia
- Part of: Archaeological Site of Carthage

History
- Built: 9th century BC

Site notes
- Management: UNESCO World Heritage Site
- Public access: Yes

UNESCO World Heritage Site
- Type: Cultural
- Criteria: i, iii, vi

The Carthage tophet is an ancient sacred area dedicated to the Phoenician deities Tanit and Baal Hammon, located in the Carthaginian district of Salammbô, Tunisia, near the Punic ports. This tophet, a "hybrid of sanctuary and necropolis", contains a large number of children's tombs, estimated to be over 20,000, which, according to some interpretations, were sacrificed or buried here after their untimely death. The area is part of the Carthage archaeological site, a UNESCO World Heritage Site.

Plan of the various elements of the Carthage archaeological site, the tophet is shown at no. 25.

The question of the fate of these children is closely linked to Phoenician and Punic religion, but above all to the way in which religious rites – and beyond that, Phoenician and Punic civilization – were perceived by the Jews in the case of the Phoenicians, or by the Romans during the conflicts that pitted them against the Punics. Indeed, the term "tophet" was originally used to designate a place near Jerusalem, synonymous with hell: this name, taken from biblical sources, leads to a macabre interpretation of the rites supposed to take place there. Recent works have been inspired on this site's history, such as Gustave Flaubert's novel Salammbô (1862), which gave its name to the district where the sanctuary was discovered. Also, the comic strip Le Spectre de Carthage, part of the adventures of Alix written by Jacques Martin, gets inspiration from here.

The major difficulty in determining the cause of the burials lies in the fact that the only written sources reporting the rite of child sacrifice are all foreign to the city of Carthage (for example, Bible). As for the archaeological sources – stelae and cippes – they are open to multiple interpretations. As a result, the debate between the various historians who have studied the subject has been lively for a long time, and has yet to be completely settled. The utmost caution is therefore called for, as ancient historians are faced with written and archaeological sources that are, if not divergent, at least open to interpretation.

== Discovery and excavation history ==
=== Early stages ===
The existence of stelae on the site has been known for a considerable period, with the earliest documented references dating back to 1817. These stelae were scattered throughout the Carthage archaeological site due to the dispersal that occurred following its destruction in 146 BC and the subsequent urban development activities that disturbed the soil during the construction of the Roman city. Over time, the Carthage site became a target for significant exploitation, including the quarrying of building materials, including marble. This contributed to the gradual deterioration of the main monuments. Between 1825 and 1827, Jean-Émile Humbert a Dutch soldier and archaeologist, sent cippi and votive bases to the National Museum of Antiquities in Leiden. The Archaeological Museum of Kraków also has some very fine Punic stelae from the site.

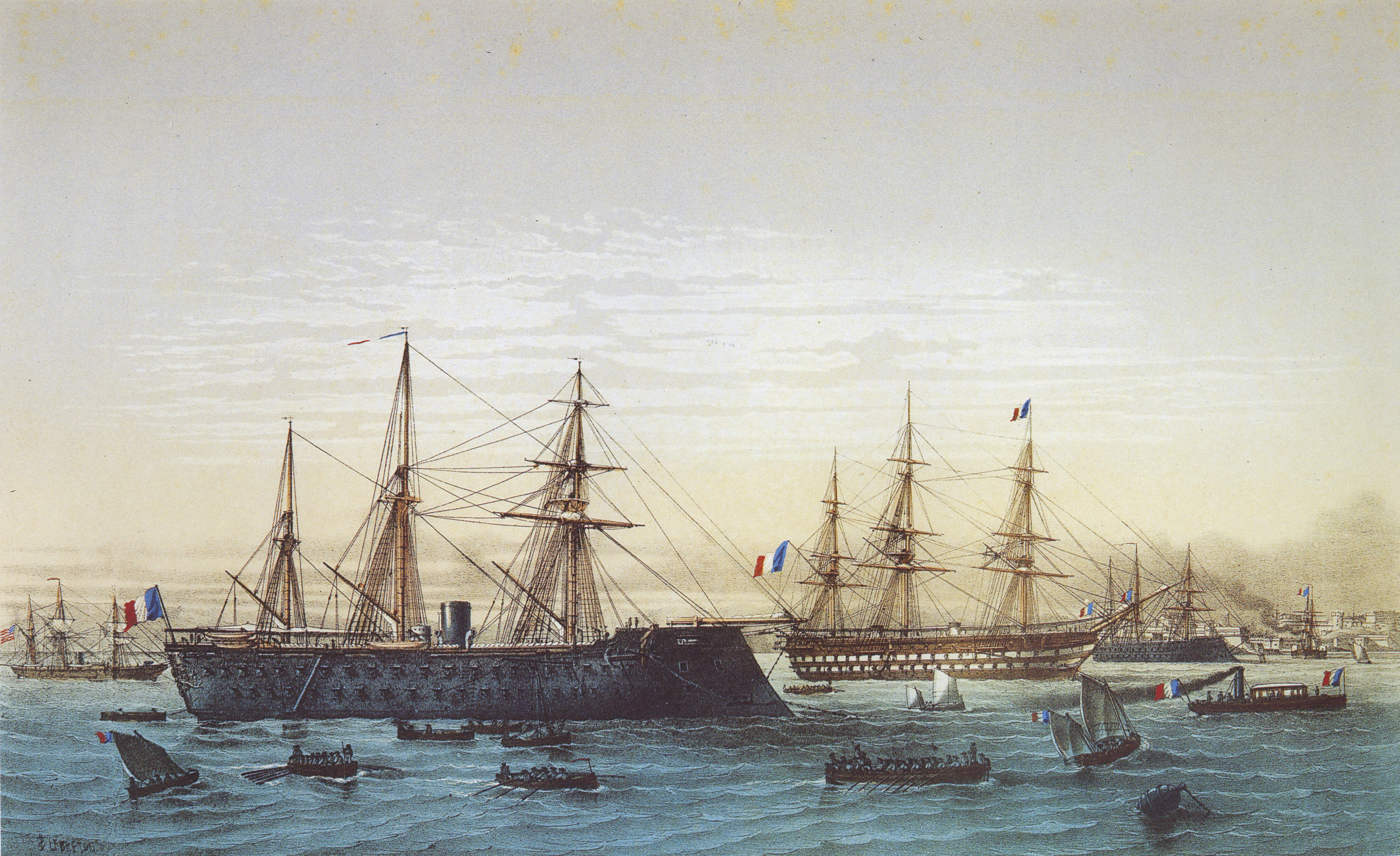
The Magenta in Brest harbor

A special place in Carthage's history must also be given to the cargo of the Louvre and the sinking of the Magenta, flagship of the Mediterranean fleet, which sank at Toulon on October 31, 1875, following a fire followed by an explosion. On board were over 2,000 Punic stelae and other artefacts, including the statue of Empress Sabina, wife of the Roman Emperor Hadrian (117-138). The archaeological finds had been loaded at La Goulette, and came from the excavations (authorized by Sadok Bey) of Pricot de Sainte-Marie, an interpreter for the French General Consulate. Following the shipwreck, the divers recovered some of the steles and the statue, while the archaeological pieces were dispersed among various collections, including the Bibliothèque nationale de France. As for the wreck, it was dynamited so as not to impede access to the port. At a depth of twelve meters, what remained of the wreck gradually silted up. Three archaeological campaigns were carried out in 1995–1998 by Max Guérout and the Groupe de recherche en archéologie navale to recover steles and the head of the statue. In April–May 1995, the head of the statue of Sabine was found, followed in April–May 1997 by some 60 fragments of stelae and fragments of the statue. Finally, in 1998, 77 fragments or steles were brought back to the surface.

Jean Herszek Spiro (1847-1914), a pastor and one-time professor at Sadiki College, was one of the pioneers of this field. He returned to Lausanne with 19 stelae, and wrote a book on Les inscriptions et les stèles votives de Carthage (1895). We have no indication of the discovery of the tophet in either Pricot de Sainte-Marie's or Spiro's excavations. In the case of the former, the discovery of steles reused in walls dating from the Roman period was all that was mentioned. All these remains, originally from the tophet, had been moved in antiquity, and no one was looking for a precise location where they could have been grouped together. Spiro's archaeological collections were mainly epigraphic in nature. A fortuitous discovery was to change our understanding of a whole section of the topography of Punic Carthage.

=== Discovery of 1921 ===
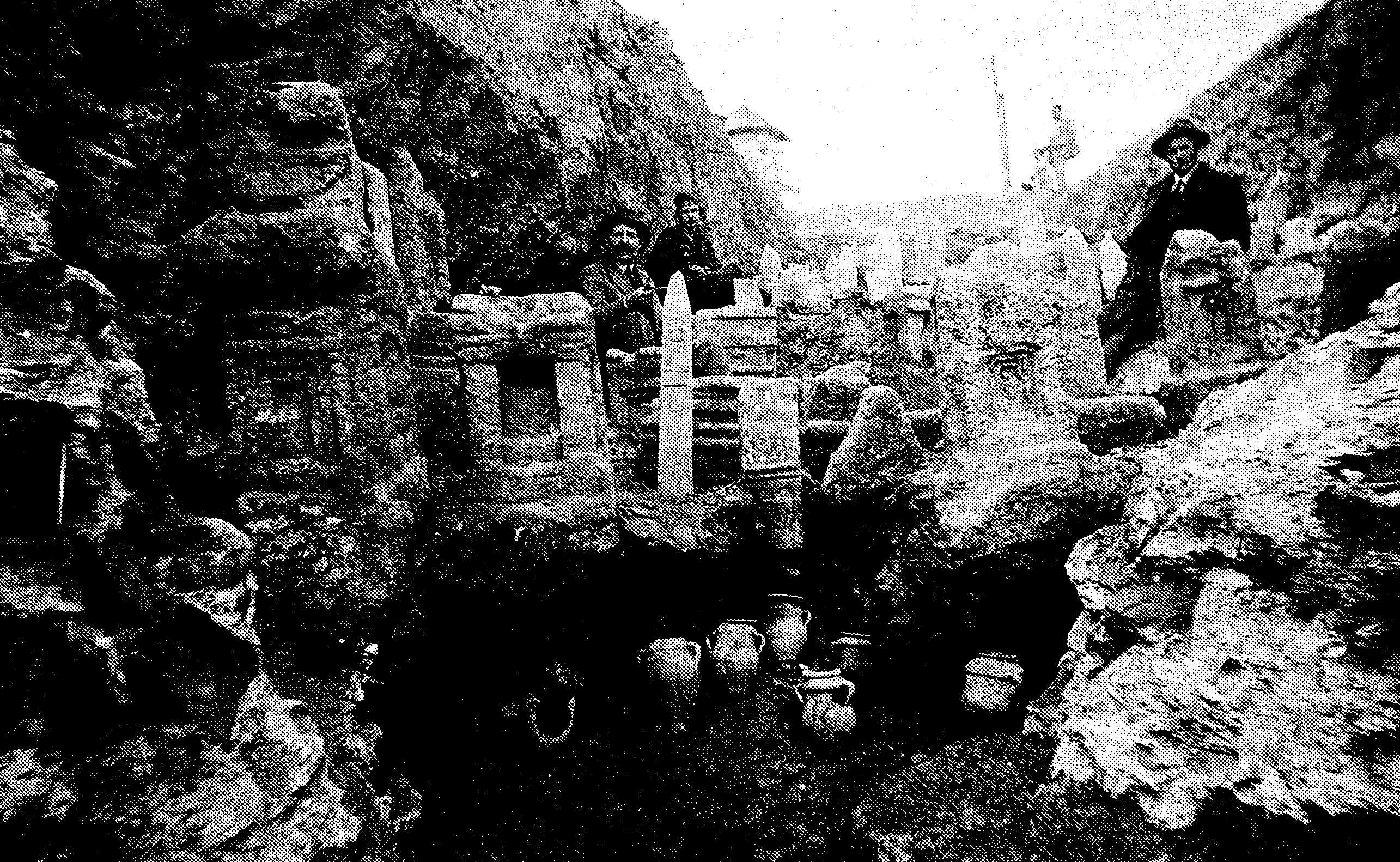
Tophet excavations in 1921.

In 1921, the Stele of the Priest was unearthed as part of the clandestine archaeological digs that were very common at the time. A limestone stele, over a metre high, depicting an adult wearing a typical kohanim (Punic priest) hat, a Punic tunic and holding a young child in his arms, was offered by an outfitter to antiquities enthusiasts Paul Gielly and François Icard, civil servants stationed in Tunisia. They bought the land and excavated it until the autumn of 1922.

The first American excavation, led by Francis Willey Kelsey and Donald Benjamin Harden in 1925, provided a comprehensive understanding of the site's organization. Sadly, Kelsey's death in 1927 brought this excavation session to an end. Father Gabriel-Guillaume Lapeyre, a white father, excavated a neighboring site in 1934–1936 and collected a variety of archaeological and epigraphic material, but without the stratigraphic details needed to understand the context of the discovery.

=== Recent excavations: from Pierre Cintas to Unesco's international campaign ===
==== "Cintas Chapel" and places of worship ====
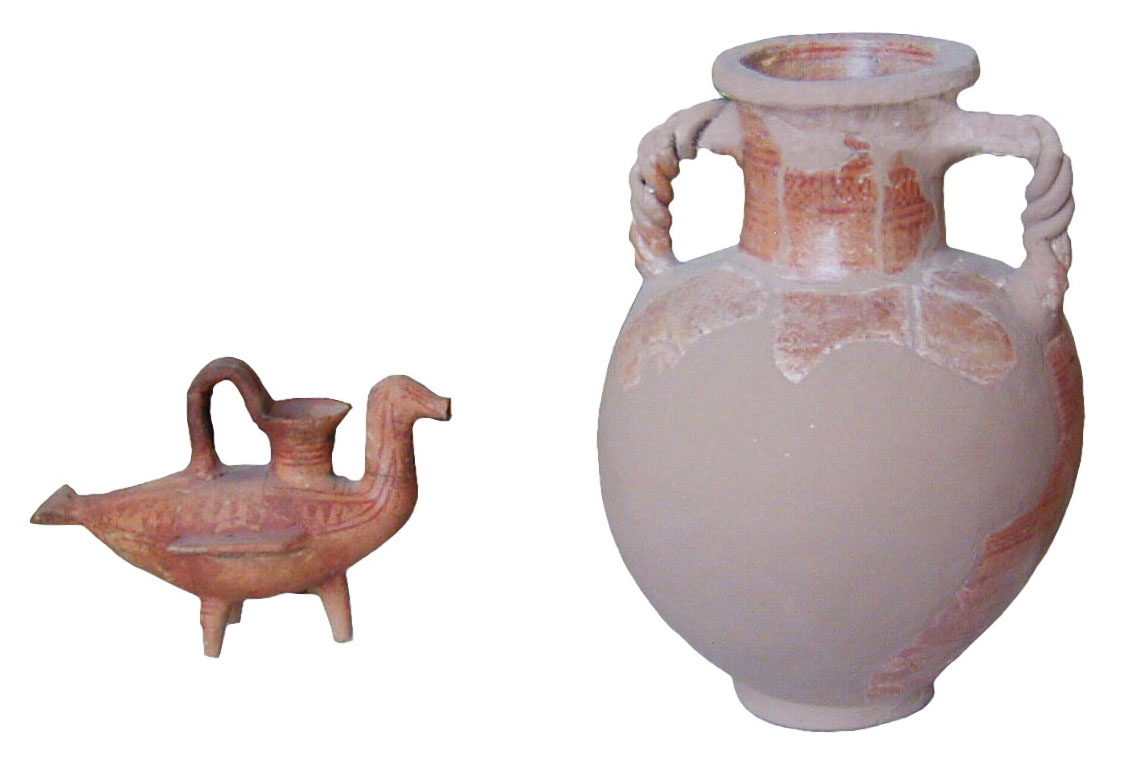
Part of the furniture from the Cintas chapel on display at the Carthage National Museum.

From the end of World War II onwards, Pierre Cintas carried out excavations on the site and, in 1947, discovered one of the features that caused such controversy at the time: the feature known as the "Cintas chapel" in honour of its discoverer. Surrounded by masonry in a chamber measuring approximately 1 m², what was interpreted as a high-period foundation deposit was made up of ceramic pieces of various origins dating from the 7th century BC, the earliest evidence of the Phoenician presence on this land. They have been extensively studied and were deposited in crevices in the native soil. The meandering dating of the ceramics in particular, some of which were clearly Aegean, means that the date was lower than that first proposed by Cintas.

==== Latest American excavations ====
These latest excavations, linked to the international campaign led by UNESCO, took place between 1976 and 1979 under the aegis of the American Schools of Oriental Research (ASOR) and Lawrence Stager.

As a result of the excavations, it was proven that the site had been in continuous use for six centuries, with an estimated surface area of 6,000 m^{2}, 20,000 urns having been discovered in various strata:

As soon as the sacred area was fully occupied, it was covered with earth, and the depositions began again at the next level.

The remains discovered during the initial excavations were subjected to forensic analysis, the results of which caused more confusion than provided answers to the nagging questions posed by specialists.

== Site topography and archaeological findings ==
=== Site characteristics ===
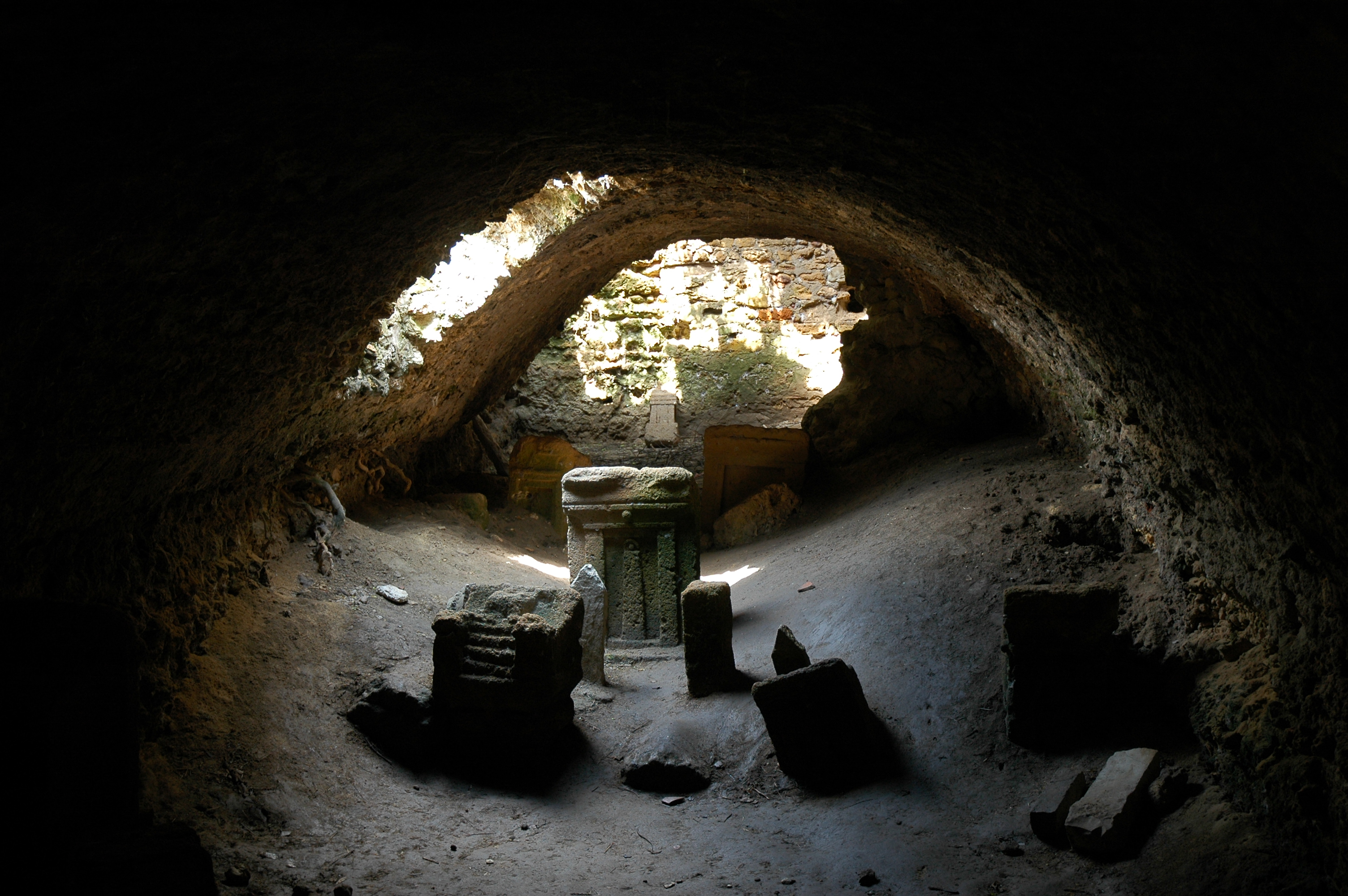
Tophet under Roman foundations.

"To dig is to destroy": this common adage of archaeologists (the digger destroys the object of his science) is even more valid in the case of the tophet, due to the nature of the site, "a series of superimposed layers of earth, urns and ex-voto" and the superimposition of steles. It should also be pointed out that the site's perimeter was not precisely known, due to the upheaval of the Carthage site since Roman times and the intense urbanization that meant that the tophet was then located in a residential area. Situated at the southern end of the city, close to the commercial port, the site was in a particularly unhealthy, marshy location. During excavations, archaeologists reached a level of brackish water.

The tophet, like that of Motya, was located away from the living and even from the necropolis stricto sensu, and shared four characteristics with the other tophets:

First and foremost, the site is pristine, with no archaeological layers predating the arrival of the Phoenician merchants having been found during the various archaeological excavations. The same applies to the other tophets that have been identified and excavated in the Phoenician-Punic world.

The site is also located in the open air, although the best-known image of the tophet is that of the part located under Roman vaults, which was uncovered during the Kelsey excavations. This image, which admittedly corresponds fairly closely to a place where the much-hated sacrifice would have taken place, is not the space as it appeared at the time, delimited and in the open air.

The third characteristic of a tophet is the fact that the site is usually entirely enclosed: at Carthage, however, the tophet enclosure was only partially recognized at the time of Pierre Cintas's excavations. However, this enclosure seems to have been overrun as early as the 5th century BC. As for the precise surface area of the tophet, it is highly unlikely that it will ever be known, given the urban spread of contemporary Carthage, particularly in the coastal zone.

The final feature of the site is its dual function: votive (stelae dedicated to Ba'al Hammon or Tanit) and funerary (funerary stelae). Evidence of this dual function is to be found in the fact that the term "molk" (offering) is very rarely found in the stelae inscribed with epigraphs, the others being associated with funerary urns with no other indication.

=== Stratigraphy of the tophet and typology of the stelae and cippes ===
==== Period organization (Tanit I, II, III) ====
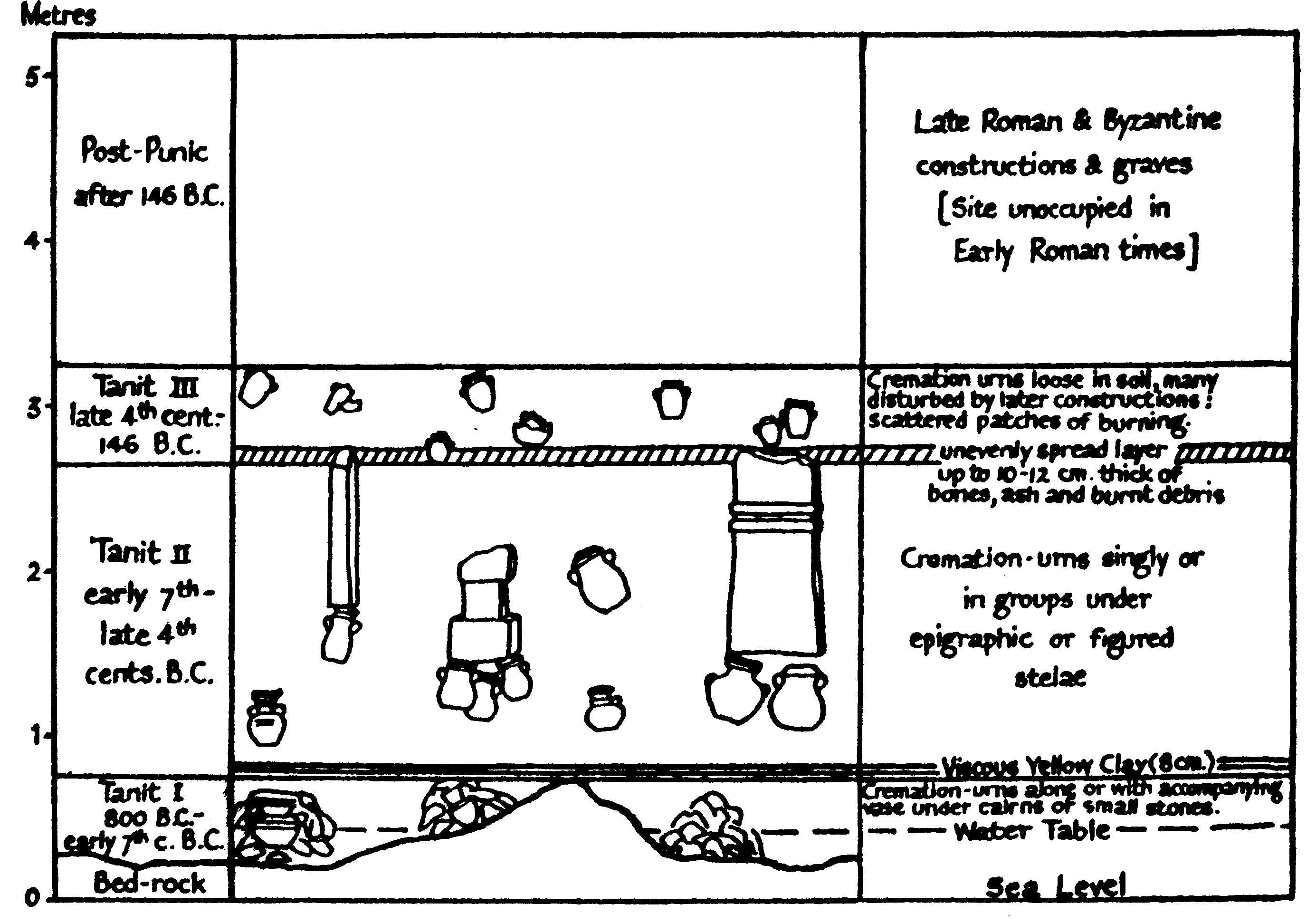
Harden stratigraphy (excavated by Kelsey in 1925).

The typology of the finds, and stelae in particular, is the fruit of American excavations, starting with the Kelsey-Harden digs of 1925, and was refined in the 1970s, as summarized by François Decret: "Taking into account the various types of pottery containing the ashes of victims and the installation of sacrificial deposits, we can distinguish three phases in this stratification: the earliest, where the vases were covered under piles of small stones or pebbles; the second [...] which contains urns placed under obelisk-shaped stones, baetylus or under cippes of various types; and the most recent, characterized by flat stelae with triangular tops, sometimes flanked by acroterion".

The depositions all have a stereotypical character: a buried urn surrounded by stones containing burnt bones, accompanied by funerary offerings such as terracotta masks and small glass paste masks found during archaeological excavations, and surmounted by monuments, which may have been steles or cippes.

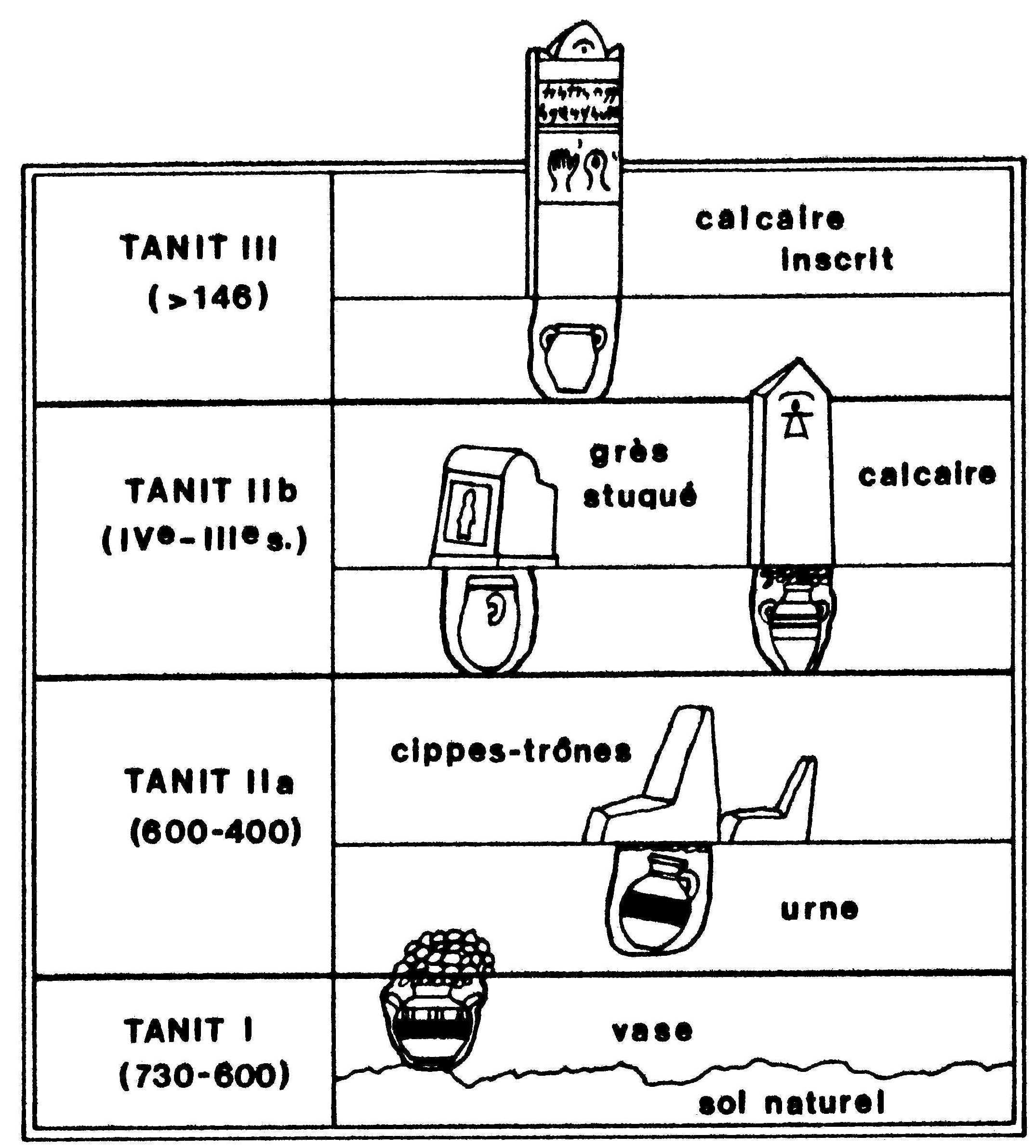
Stratigraphy of the tophet (ASOR excavations 1976–1979).

Excavations have enabled us to characterize the various periods in which the tophet was used, moving from an Egyptian influence to a Hellenistic style: the first, known as Tanit I (750 B.C.-600 B.C.) features sandstone cippes and baetylus, with the urns deposited in crevices in the native soil and a sandstone cippe-trone. The Tanit II period (5th century BC – 8th century BC) presents a sub-section: the cippe-trone is still present at Tanit II-a, but at Tanit II-b, it is replaced by limestone steles. The last period of use of the site, Tanit III (2nd century BC -146 BC), features fine limestone stelae (1st century BC) with acroteria, sometimes richly decorated with carvings of various motifs.

==== Types of motifs found on stelae ====
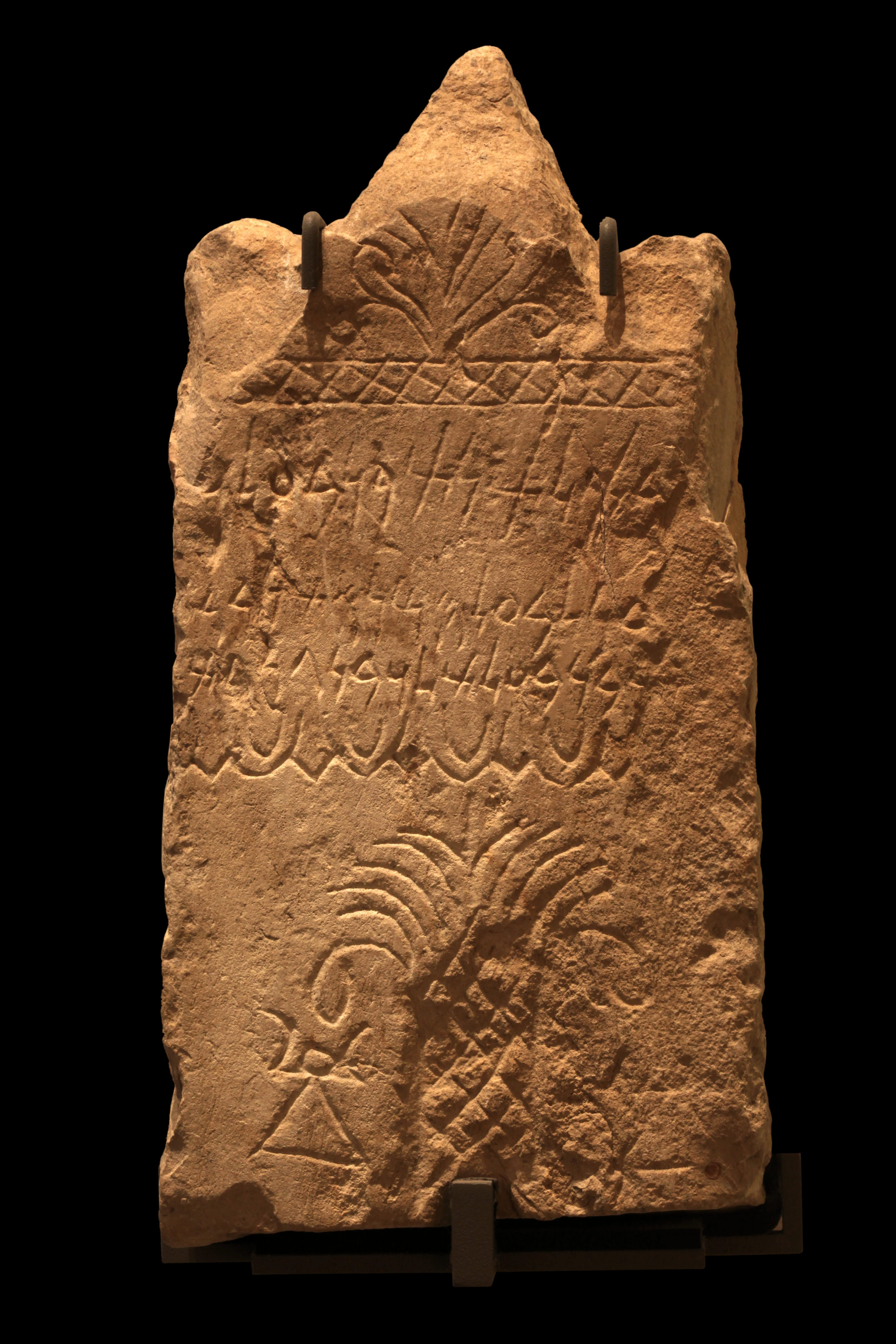
Stele with a Phoenician votive inscription, palm motif, and sign of Tanit, from the Carthage tophet, now in the Museum of Fine Arts, Lyon

These signs are particularly common on late stelae, as the shapes of early stelae are indicative of influences, particularly Egyptian.

There are many religious symbols, including the sign of Tanit, long considered to be specific to the Phoenicians of the western Mediterranean basin, but examples of which have been discovered in excavations in present-day Lebanon. The sign of the bottle is also very present, having been identified with the mother goddess who has always been present in the Mediterranean Basin. The astral signs, moon and sun, are also represented and sometimes intertwined to form a rosette; these signs are symbols of eternity.

On later stelae, figurative ornamentation emerges: animals (elephants), vegetal elements (palm trees), humans, such as an open hand, portraits revealing Hellenic influence and, of course, representations of men in their entirety (scene of the priest with the child) and marine elements (boat). This blending of Semitic features and external contributions is most evident when Carthage comes into contact with the Greek world, particularly Sicily.

==== Punic epigraphy ====
The stelae were sometimes engraved with inscriptions of the same type, but which revealed the tophet as "a sanctuary of popular expression and fervent piety".

The dedicators either made a wish or thanked for its fulfillment: "To the great lady Tanit Péné Ba'al and to the lord Baal Hammon, what [such-and-such], son of [such-and-such], has offered, may they [Ba'al] or she [Tanit] hear [his] voice and bless [him]". The inscriptions were stereotyped in a "desperately dry and repetitive form".

Various Punic stelae
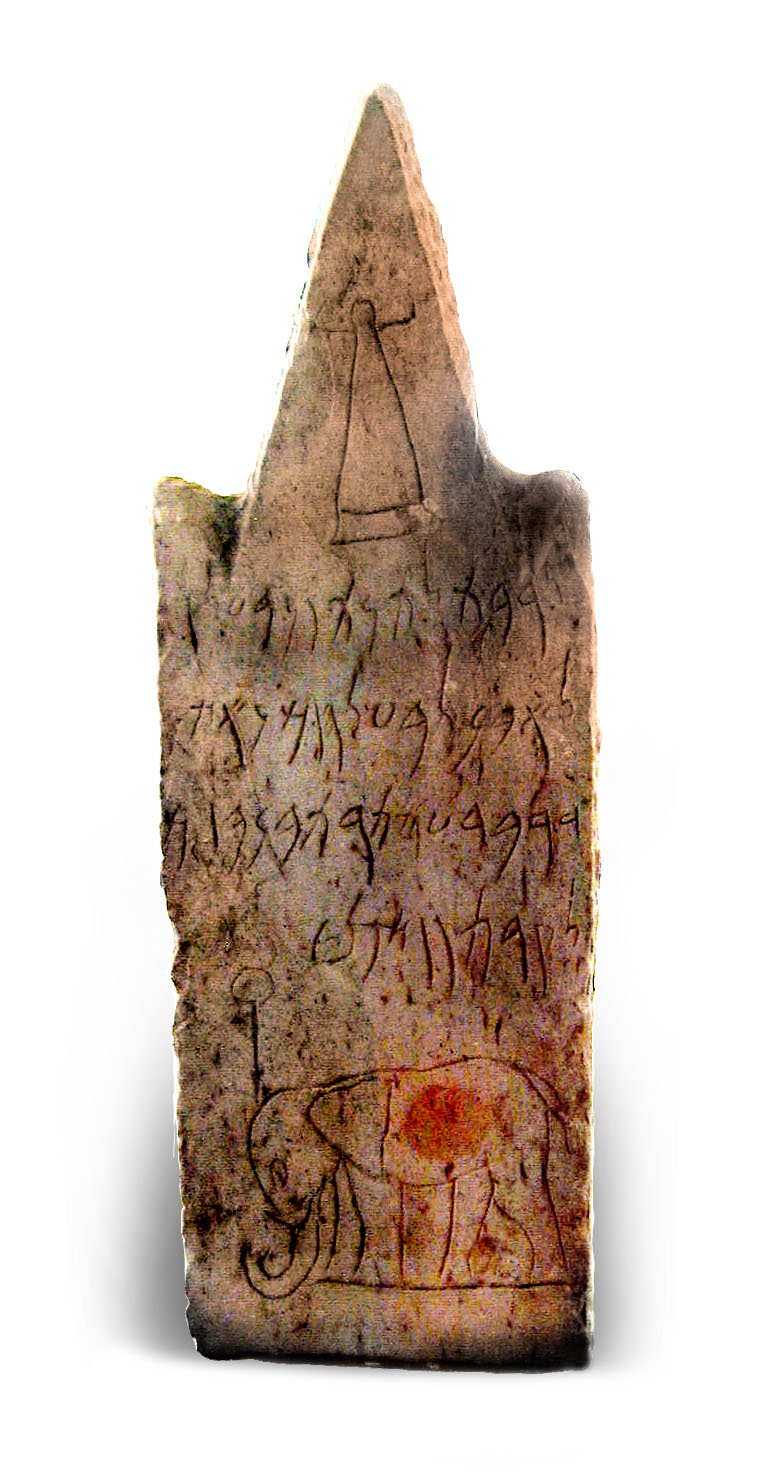
Late stele with elephant.

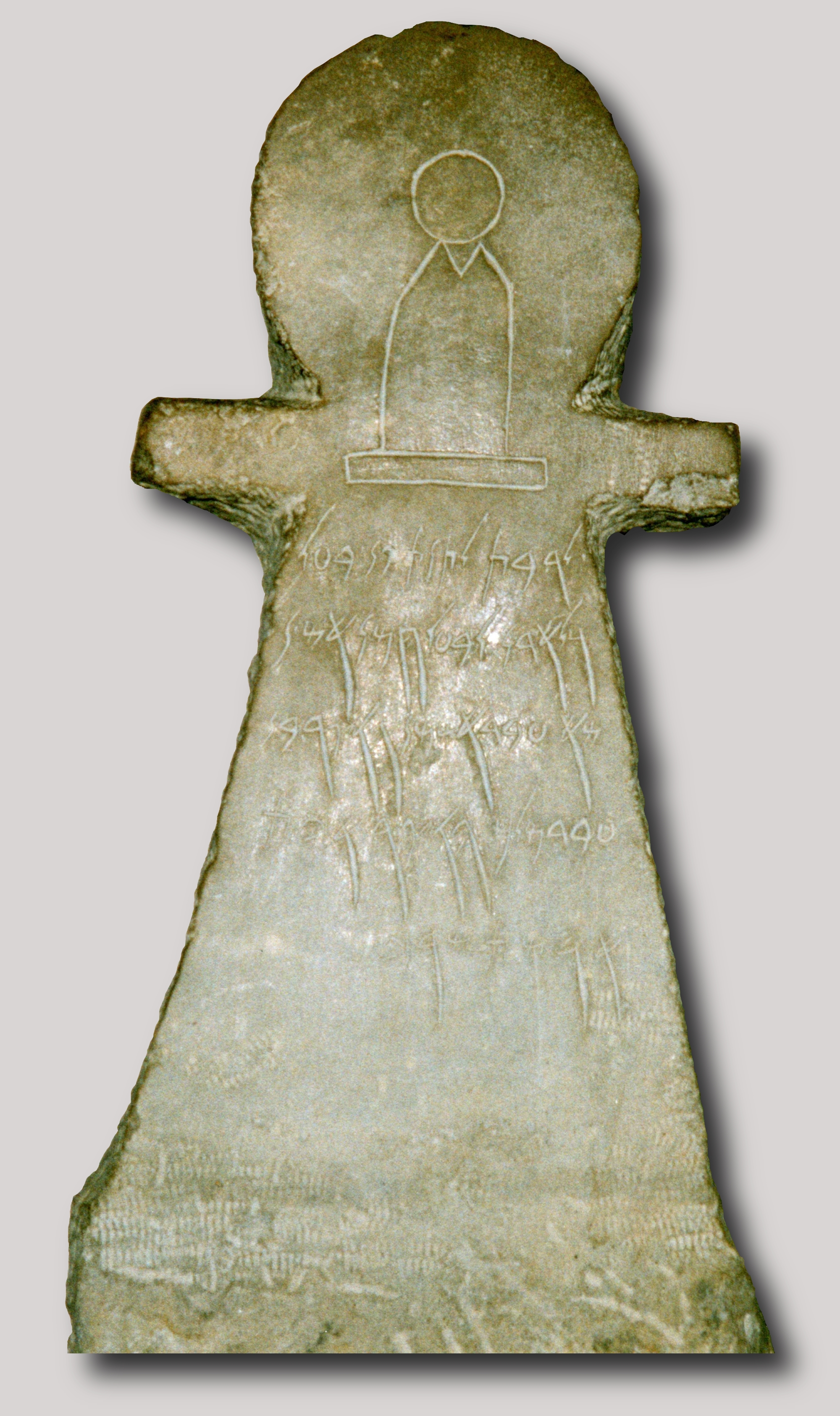
Stele in the form of a Tanit sign with bottle sign.

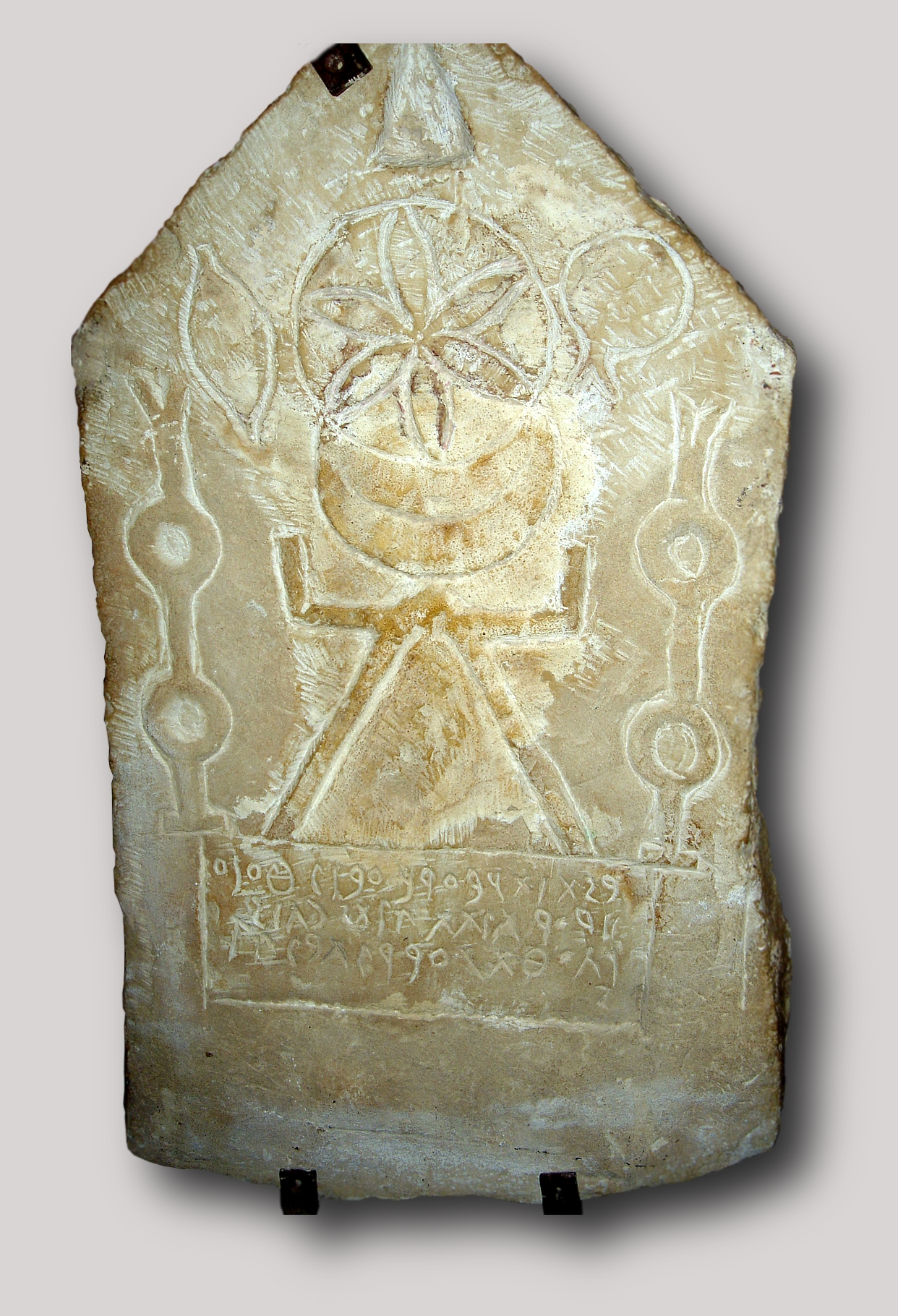
Stele with sign of Tanit, intersecting moon and rosette, and pomegranate.

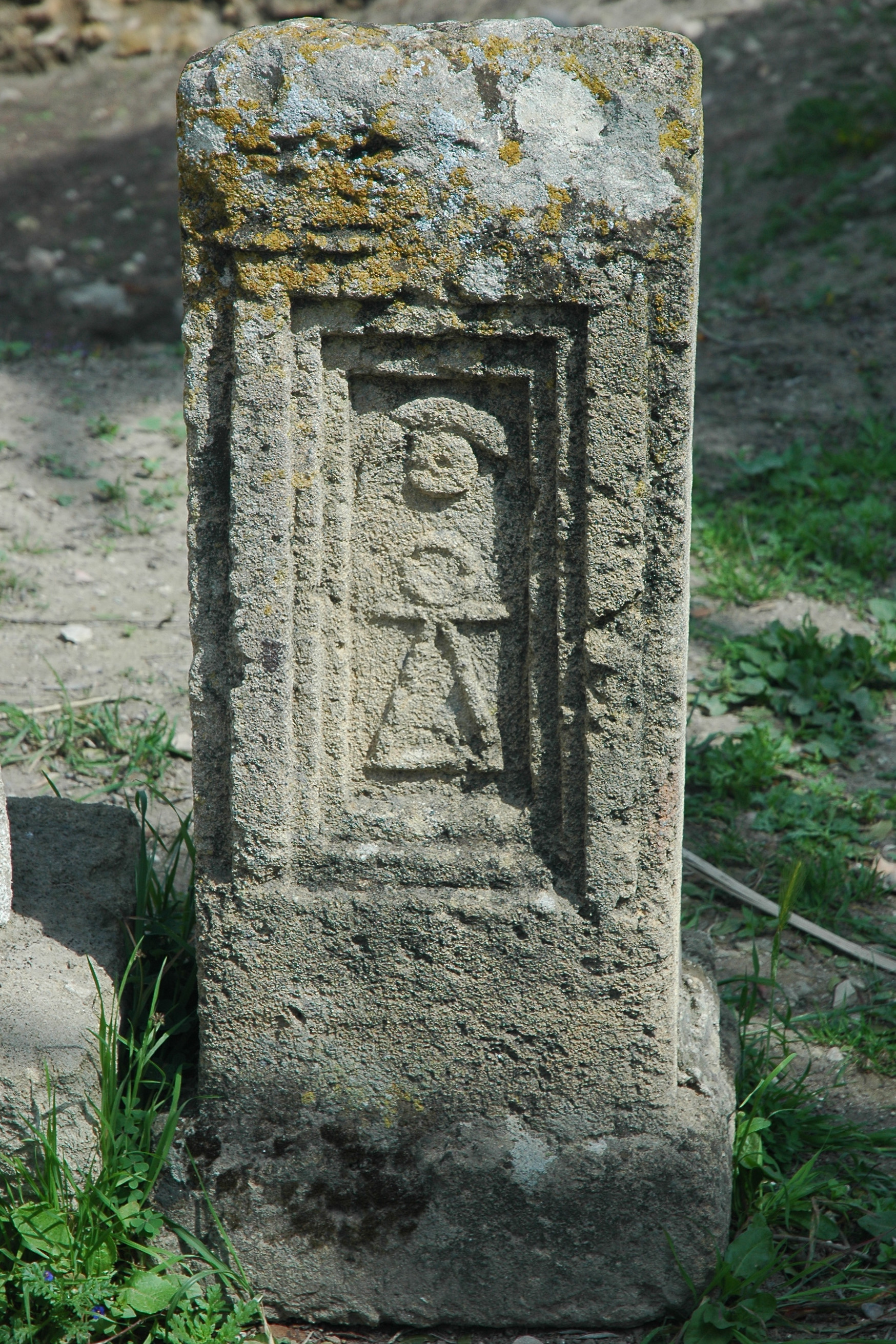
Stele with Tanit sign and astral symbols.

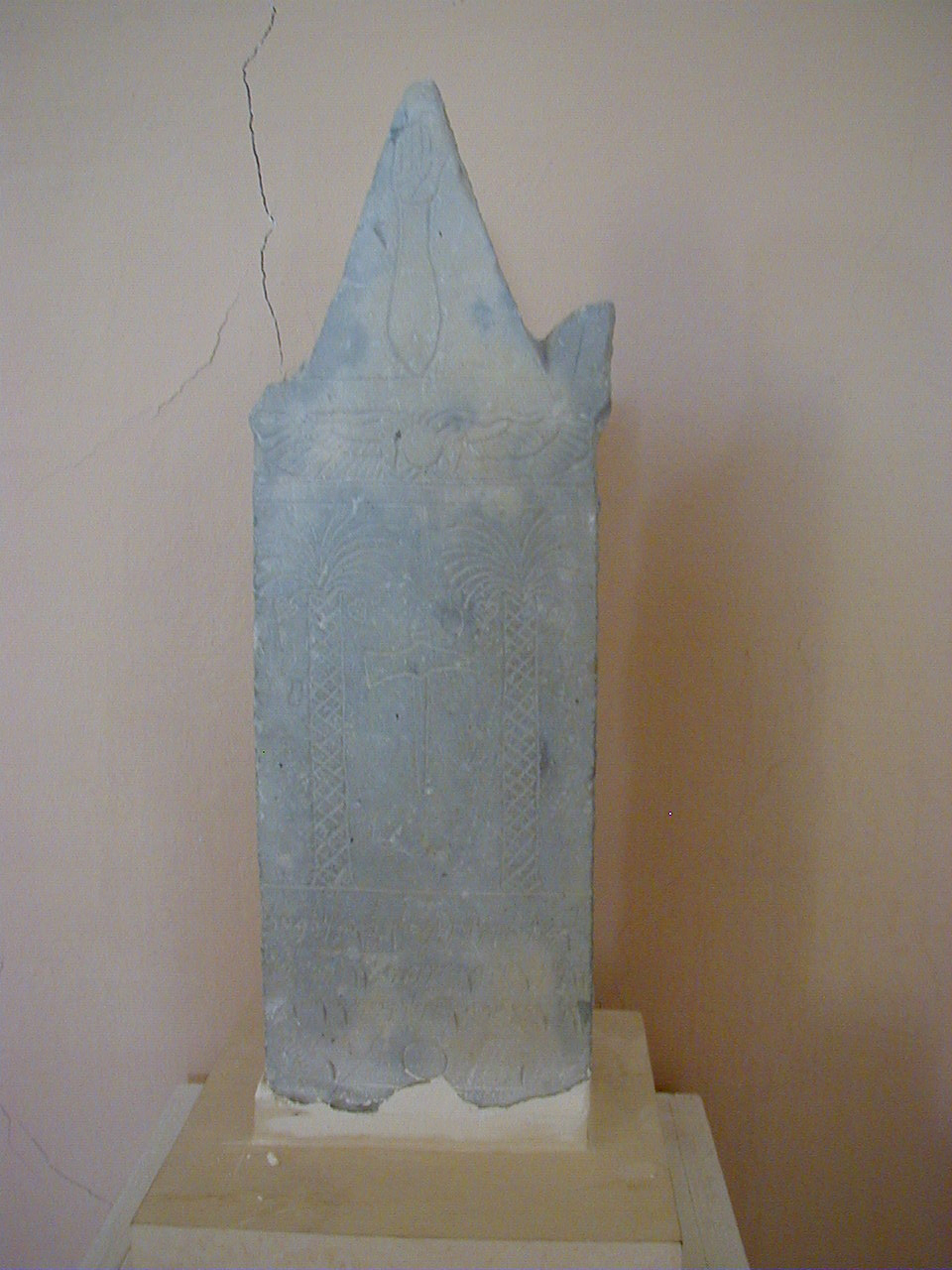
Stele with palm trees and wings of Egyptian inspiration.

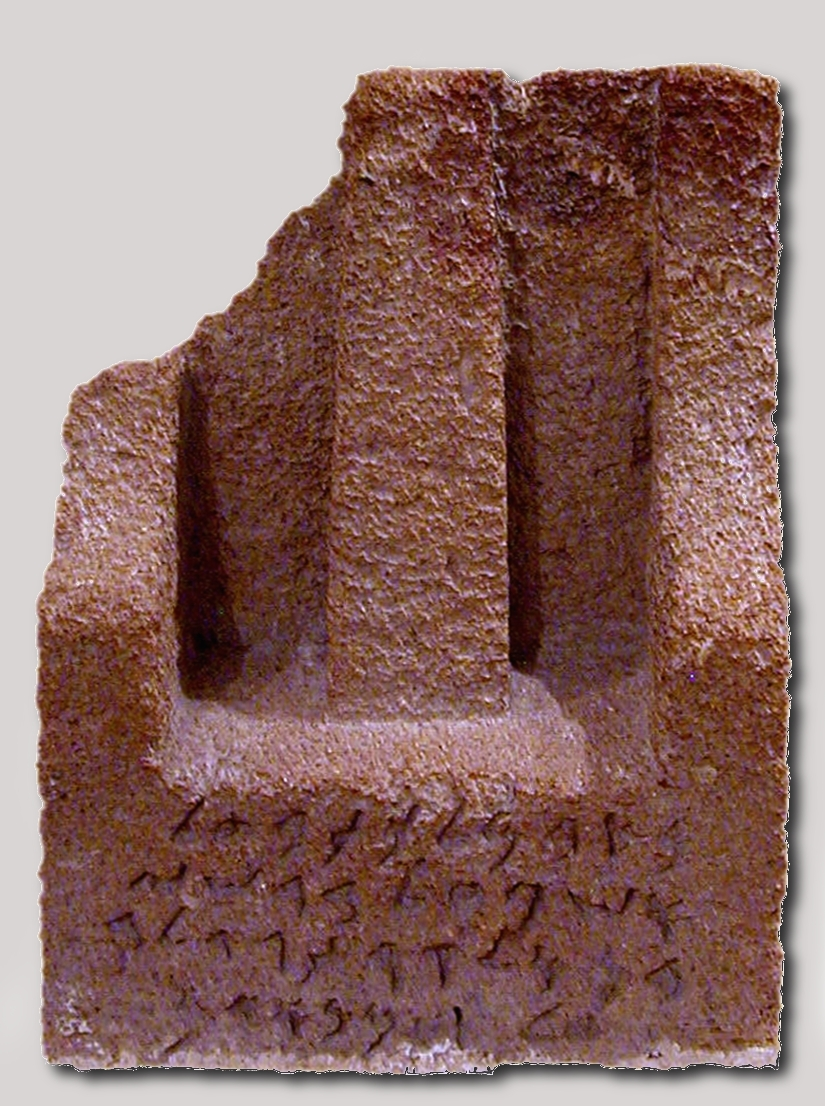
Stele with obelisk and inscription.

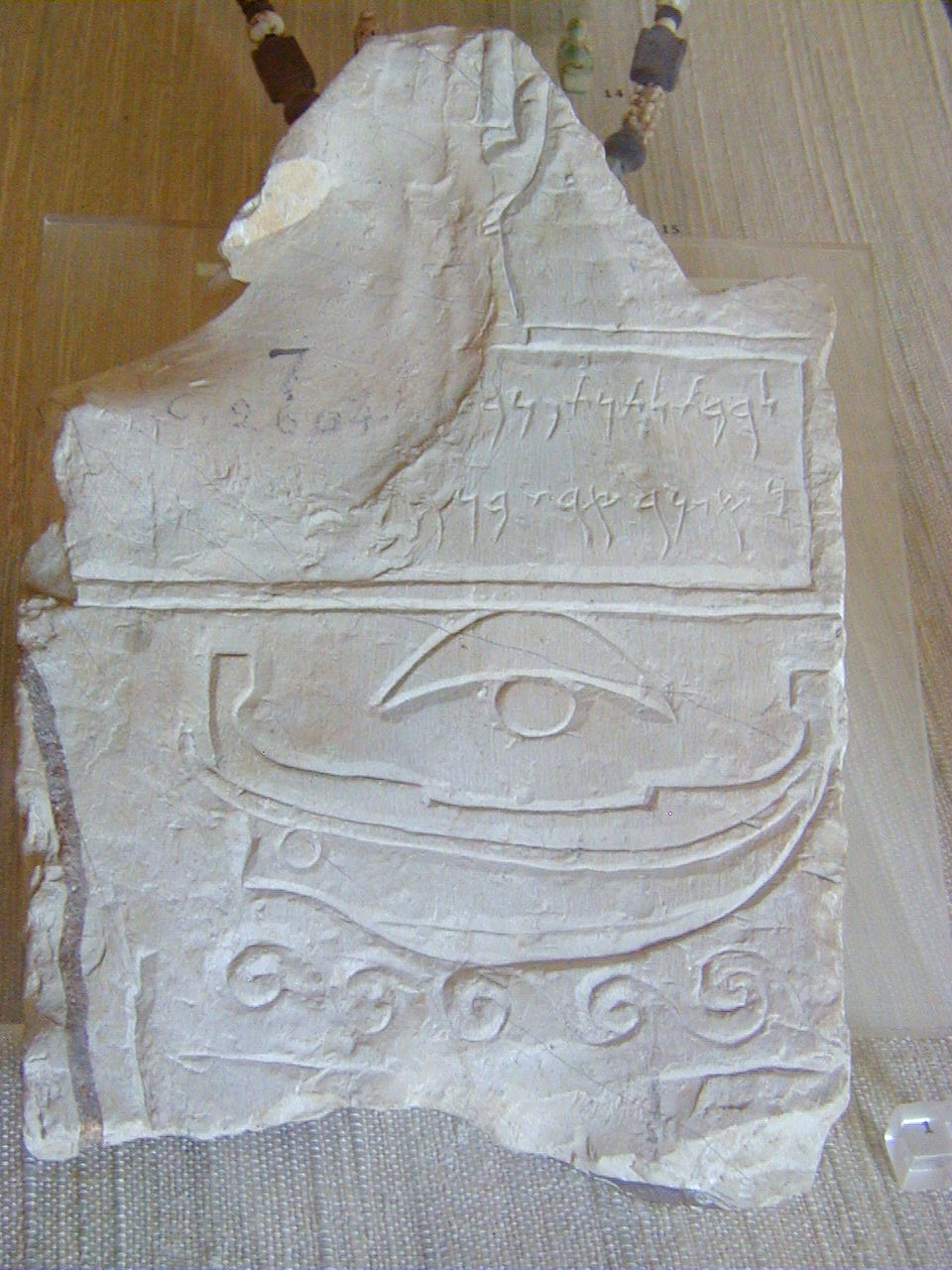
Late stele with limestone acroterion and ship.

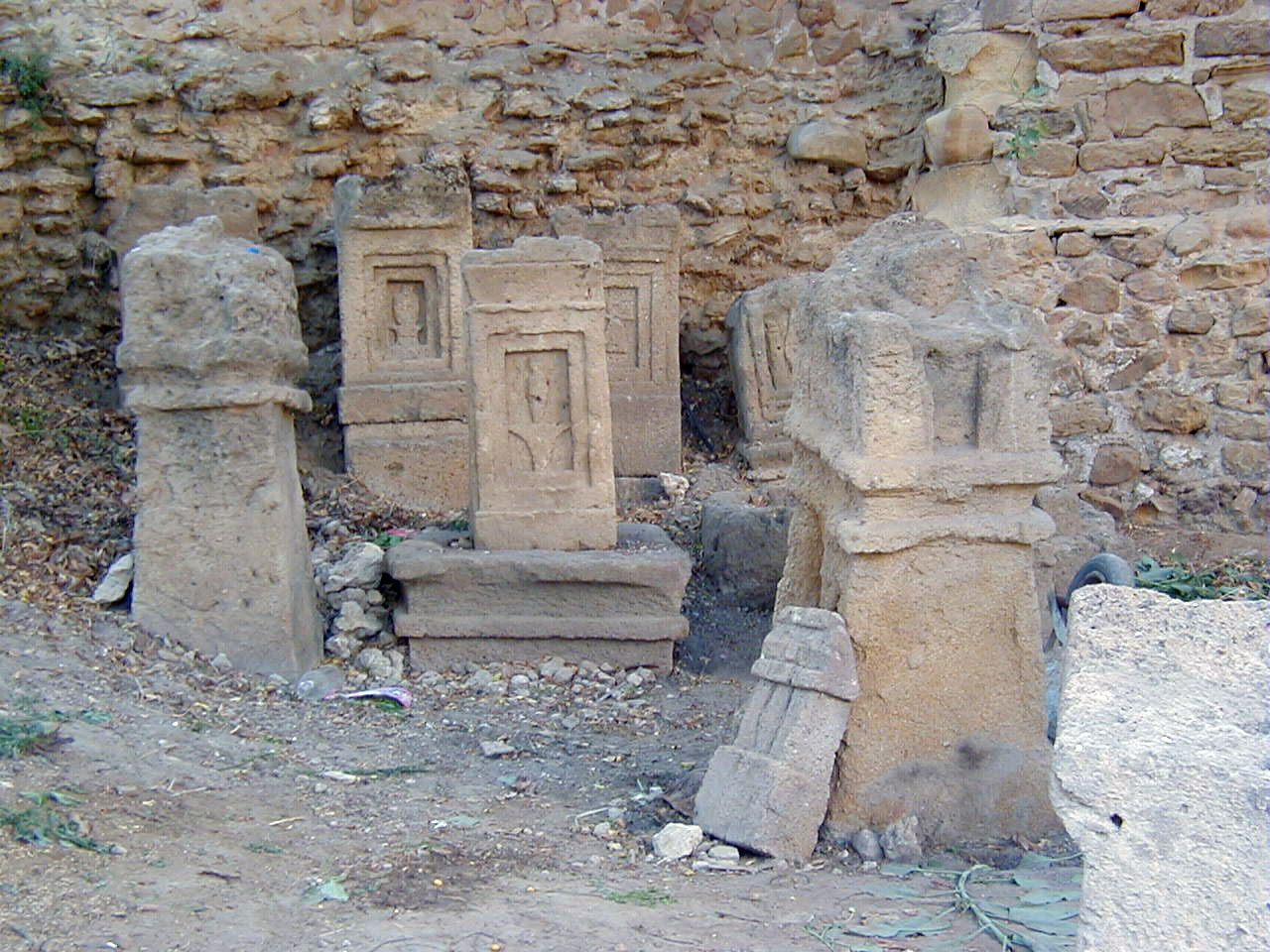
Small group of Tanit II stelae.

=== Roman occupation of the site ===
In Roman times, the site was reused: the foundations of a temple dedicated to Saturn were uncovered during excavations, and numerous foundations for later buildings pierced the archaeological layers. Also visible on the site are Roman foundation piers, at the site of the tophet excavated by Pierre Cintas, craftsmen's workshops (potters) and hangars, as well as houses that had yielded mosaics, including a mosaic of the Seasons now in the Bardo Museum.

The current site is an important part of the tour of ancient Carthage, although the layout is a motley collection of stelae from various periods, especially the earliest. Almost all the stelae on display are of El Haouaria sandstone, although there are a few later limestone stelae in the vaulted section.

=== Archaeological debate on child sacrifice at the site ===
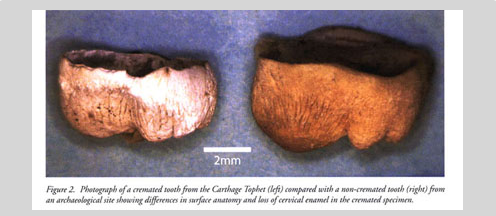
Picture taken from Smith's Antiquity article "Cemetery or sacrifice? Infant burials at the Carthage Tophet". This image compares the teeth of a cremated child found at the Carthage tophet to normal child teeth from a separate archaeological site.

Whether or not child sacrifice was practiced at the Carthage tophet remains a contentious issue for archaeologists. There is a lively debate among archaeologists whether the Tophet was merely a child cemetery or a location for ritual sacrifice. Several articles have been published in the archaeological journal Antiquity interpreting the excavation of the Carthage Tophet. Patricia Smith and Jeffery Schwartz published a series of articles to Antiquity between 2010 and 2013 going back and forth on the issue. Both archaeologists cast doubt on the conclusions the other had drawn from the site's remains. Schwartz was adamant that the remains found at the Carthage tophet were of newly born children that died of natural causes. Smith challenged this view citing that the bones suffered shrinkage due to cremation and children of similar ages found in ordinary Punic cemeteries were not cremated. These cremated remains were also discovered with animal remains that had been cremated as well. There are no animal remains found with children at other Levantine and Carthaginian cemeteries. Smith came to the conclusion that the Carthage tophet was likely the location of ritual child sacrifice. The debate over the purpose of the Carthage tophet is still ongoing. There is no definitive evidence proving it was a child cemetery or a place of child sacrifice. Historical context and ancient sources should be taken into account when defining this area of the Carthaginian settlement. This angle is lacking in both Smith and Schwartz's analysis of the Carthage tophet.

== Historical interpretations of the site ==
=== Ancient sources ===
==== Charged sources ====
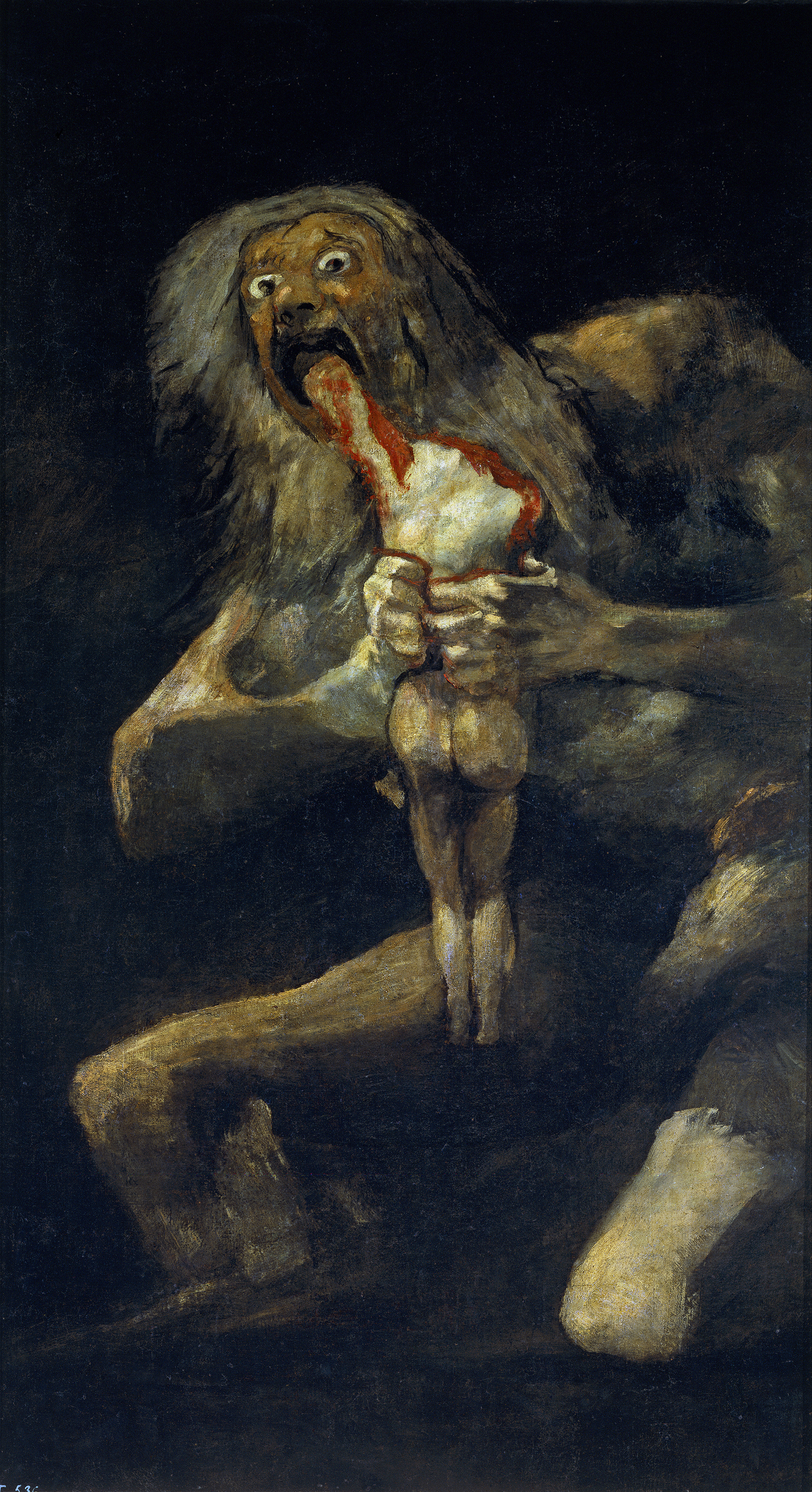
The myth of Saturn revisited by painter Francisco de Goya.

The ancient sources that mention the religious rites of the Punics are Greek and Latin. Diodorus Siculus refers to them at length in connection with the attack on Carthage by Agathocles, tyrant of Syracuse: "They [the Carthaginians] considered that Cronus was also hostile to them, because they, who had previously sacrificed the best of their sons to this god, had begun secretly buying children whom they then fed and sent to the sacrifice. Upon investigation, it was discovered that some of the sacrificed [children] had been substituted. Considering these things, and seeing the enemy [Agathocles' army] encamped before the walls, they felt a religious dread at the thought of having ruined the traditional honors due to the gods. Burning with the desire to right their wrongs, they chose two hundred of the most respected children and sacrificed them in the name of the state. Others, against whom there were murmurs, voluntarily surrendered themselves; they numbered no less than three hundred. Among them [in Carthage] was a bronze statue of Cronus, with hands outstretched, palm up, and bent towards the ground, so that the child placed in it would roll and fall into a pit full of fire".

Dionysius of Halicarnassus refers to the supposed human sacrifices in his Roman Antiquities (I, 38, 2): "It is said that the ancients sacrificed to Cronus in the way that was done in Carthage for as long as the city lasted". Porphyry of Tyre, in his treatise On Abstinence from Eating Animals (II, 56, 1) states that "the Phoenicians, on the occasion of great calamities such as wars, epidemics or droughts, sacrificed a victim taken from among the beings they cherished most, whom they designated by vote as the victim offered to Cronus".

In On Superstition (XIII), Plutarch accuses parents of failing to show piety towards their children: "The Carthaginians offered their children with full awareness and knowledge, and those who had none bought those of the poor like lambs or young birds, while the mother stood by without tears or moaning. If she moaned or cried, she was to lose the sale price, and the child was still sacrificed; however, the whole space in front of the statue was filled with the sound of flutes and drums, so that the cries could not be heard".

Later, Tertullian wrote in the Apologeticus that "children were publicly immolated to Saturn, in Africa, until the proconsulship of Tiberius, who had the very priests of this god exposed, tied alive to the very trees of his temple, which covered these crimes with their shadow, as to so many votive crosses: I take as witness my father who, as a soldier, carried out this order of the proconsul. But even today, this criminal sacrifice continues in secret".

==== Silence from other major sources ====
Other major sources for ancient history such as Herodotus, Thucydides, Polybius or Livy Titus, are silent on the question. Lancel states that "[this] silence [...] stands out sharply in the concert of accusations of impiety and perfidy that are, among classical authors, the usual lot of the Carthaginians". According to this specialist, such an absence makes little sense, as these ancient authors would point out any attitude they found shocking in relation to the ordinary practices of their Greek or Latin cultures.

== See also ==
- Moloch
- Baal Hammon
- Tanit
- French ironclad Magenta
