= Cothon =

Artificial harbor in antiquity

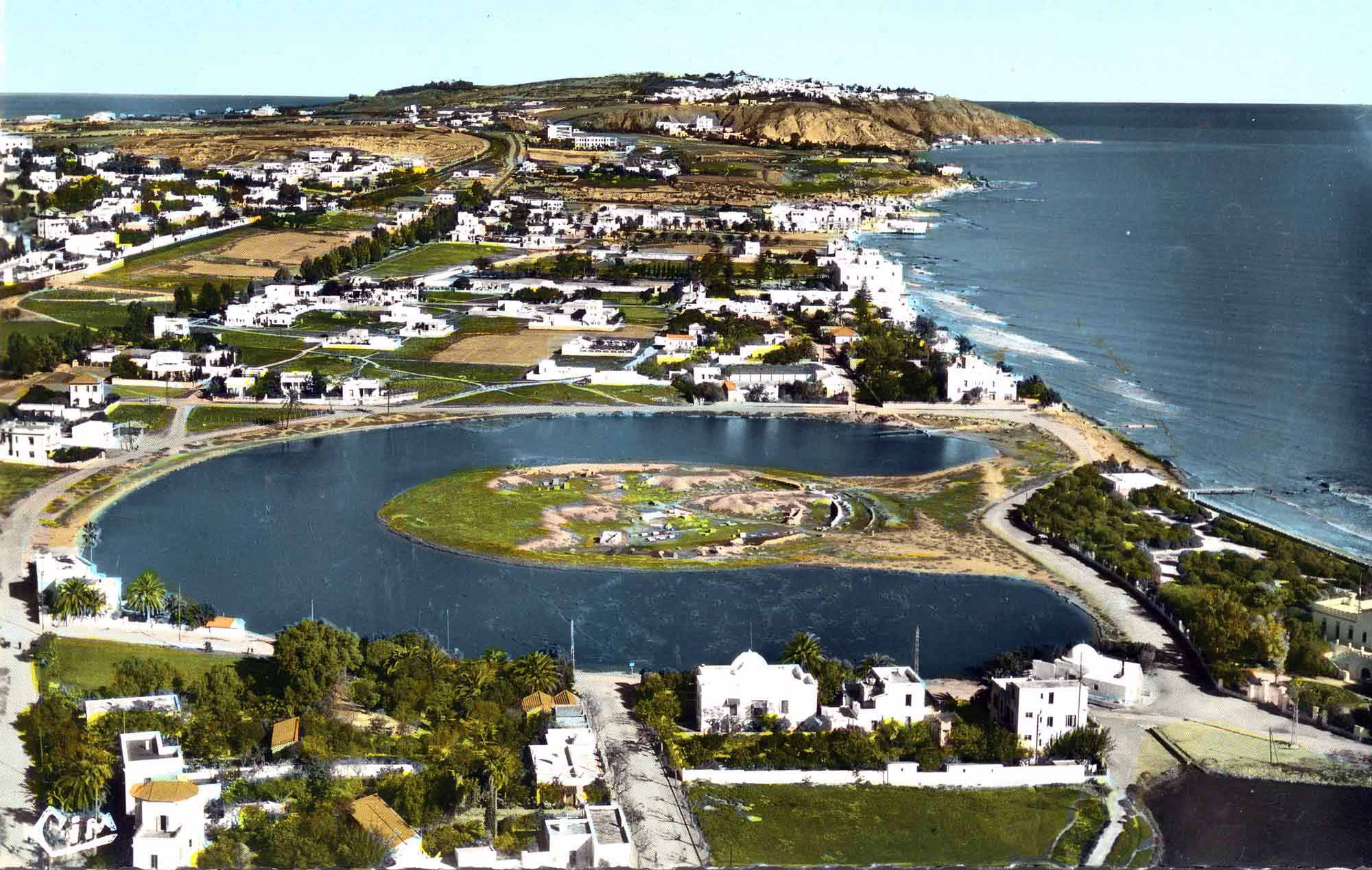
Ancient Carthaginian port, in a 1958 photograph

A cothon (Greek: κώθων, lit. 'drinking vessel') is an artificial, protected inner harbor such as that in Carthage during the Punic Wars c. 200 BC.

Cothons were generally found in the Phoenician world. Other examples include Motya in Sicily from the 6th century BC, which performed an uncertain purpose, (measuring 35 meters x 51 meters), although it has been suggested this cothon might even have been closable and drainable to form a dry dock, Mahdia in Tunisia from the 7th century BC, (which measured 72 meters x 56 meters) and one from Kition in Cyprus.

In ancient times the word "cothon" was only used to describe the harbor at Carthage. In modern times, however, archaeologists use the term to refer to similar ancient harbors constructed of a man-made basin connected to the sea by a channel. The name comes from an island in Carthage's harbor.

== The harbors of Carthage ==
The cothon at Carthage was divided into a rectangular merchant harbor followed by an inner protected harbor reserved for military use. This inner harbor was circular and surrounded by an outer ring of structures divided into a series of docking bays for ship maintenance, along with an island structure at its center that also housed navy ships. Each docking bay featured a raised slipway to allow ships to be raised out of or lowered into the water. Above the raised docking bays was a second level consisting of warehouses where oars and rigging were kept along with supplies such as wood and canvas.

On the island structure, there existed a raised 'cabin' where the admiral in command could observe the whole harbor along with the surrounding sea. The inner docking complex could house up to 220 ships. The entire harbor was protected by an outer wall and the main entrance could be closed off with a boom. Most records of Carthage were destroyed when the city was razed by the Roman Empire in the Third Punic War.
