= Carthage Punic Ports =

Archeological site in Tunisia

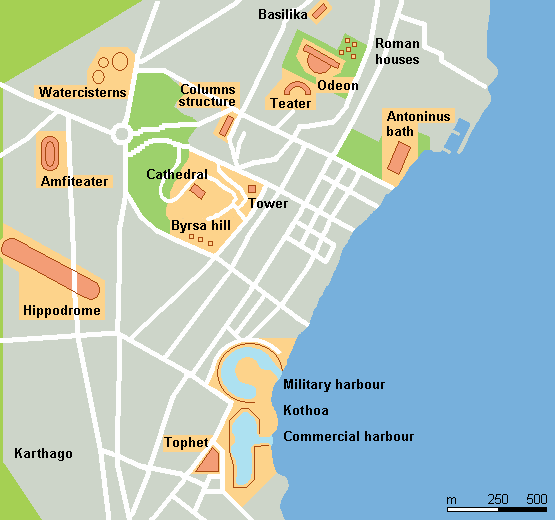
- Location of Punic ports.
- Interactive map of Carthage Punic Ports

Location
- Coordinates: 36°50′44.02″N 10°19′31.65″E

The Carthage Punic Ports were the old ports of the city of Carthage that were in operation during ancient times. Carthage was first and foremost a thalassocracy, that is, a power that was referred to as an Empire of the Seas, whose primary force was based on the scale of its trade. The Carthaginians, however, were not the only ones to follow that policy of control over the seas, since several of the people in those times "lived by and for the sea".

Carthage, or Qart Hadasht (New City), was a product of eastern colonization, having its origin in Dido, the daughter of the king of Tyre. According to her legend recorded in the Aeneid, this Tyrian princess was the founder and first queen of the city in 814 B.C. (the most widely accepted date).

Since Utica was founded around 1100 BC, Carthage is not considered the first Phoenician colony on the North African coast. Beyond its origin, the city largely controlled the entire western basin of the Mediterranean Sea and developed its African hinterland, only reaching its end when it had to face the Roman Republic, an emerging power that caused its ultimate downfall.

Due to its identity, Carthage was an anchor point between the two basins of the Mediterranean; the eastern part, known as the cradle of Phoenicia, and the western part, which was the place of its expansion and downfall.

The ports of such a city, which were the most important place of communication with the outside world, are therefore of fundamental importance in the history of Carthage in this context. Their history was documented by Appian, a historian of Ancient Greece who lived in the 2nd century BC; however, despite his description, the location of the ports was not confirmed and investigated by archaeologists until the 1970s.

== Sources and location issues ==
=== Ports location in Phoenician cities ===
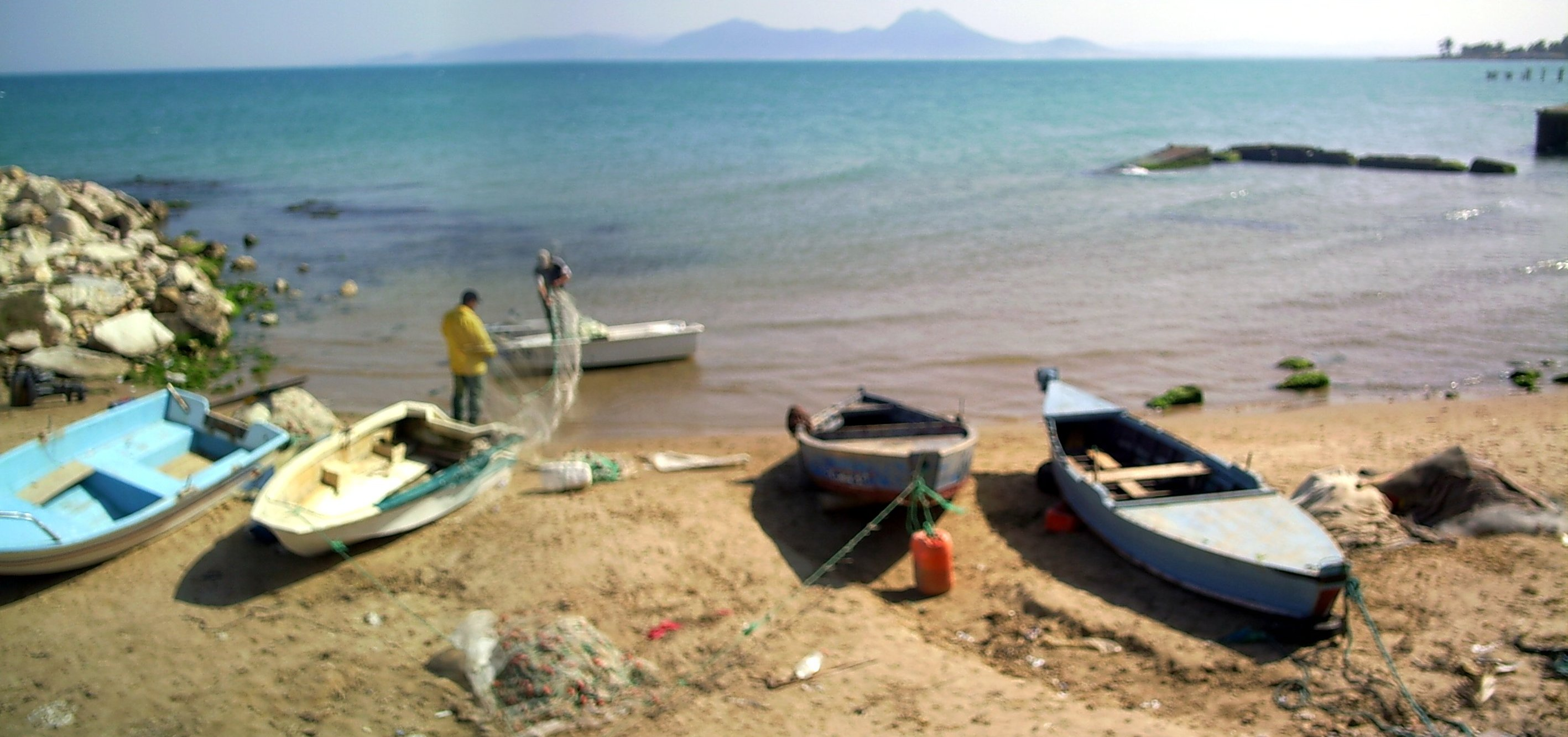
Current shore of Carthage

The Phoenicians did not entrust the choice of a new colony in a particular place to just luck. The location of the new settlement had to provide a number of peculiar requirements related to its defense and, most importantly, to its port characteristics. It was necessary that cargo ships could easily enter the port and that the opposing wind did not make access to the port impossible. To this end, the choice of the cape was particularly important. In addition, the location of the port, due to its physical characteristics, had to offer an easy defense so the settlers only had to increase the natural defences to ensure security.

The location of the New City responded particularly well to the two requirements. The embarkation area was formidably protected thanks to the opportune location of the Sidi Bou Saïd promontory, the city itself in stricto sensu. It was located on the outside of the seafront, between two stretches of water (today's Lake of Tunis and Sebkha Ariana), and the interior was intercepted by a succession of hills, which formed a natural defensive line.

=== Ports location in Carthage ===
The matter of the Carthage ports' location has been one of the most discussed in Punic historiography. By observation alone, the two present-day lagoons —one circular and the other rectangular— both joined by a thin string and identified as the ports of Carthage at the beginning of the 19th century by Chateaubriand, could not be the ports that had harboured the fleet of "Rome's greatest enemy" in the historians' minds.

The recent excavations carried out in the sector during the UNESCO international campaign (a series of American excavations carried out near the rectangular lagoon and English excavations carried out in the circular lagoon) confirmed the Punic origin of the lagoons, dating them to the 2nd century BC This dating was possible thanks to the discovery of ceramic remains, particularly in the excavations carried out in the carena coves.

However, the original port that was used during the first five centuries of the Punic history of the North African city has yet to be located, and it is not even known whether or not this port was located on the site of the lagoons. In the first two centuries of its existence, Carthage had no more port facilities than any other colony in the Mediterranean, as it merely had a place from which ships were to be launched. No visible traces of such places have remained, since they have been eliminated by later installations or by radical changes in the local topography.

The matter of the Carthage ports' location has been linked to the history and topography of the place. It is known that the location of the city concerning the shore evolved a lot over the centuries and that during ancient times a process of polderization took place, consisting of a human action that was coupled to the transport of sediments from the Bagradas river, moved there due to ocean currents.

American excavations have shown that the Carthage tophet was probably unhealthy at that time, which suggests that the primitive port sector was probably located in that area.

Archaeological excavations have uncovered the traces of a canal that suggest that it functioned until its filling in the 4th century BC. The canal in question can be followed archaeologically for about 400 m, having been built on natural terrain. Some historians have suggested that there is a link with the Lake of Tunis due to the nature of the sediments found. Serge Lancel has also documented that the level of Lake Tunis was significantly higher than in the ancient period of the city, and mentions its shores as a probable place of refuge. According to this theory, the canal was a "line of penetration" into the interior of the city. It is also assumed that there could have been a second canal parallel to the first. On the edges of these facilities would have been the naval dockyards. The hangars, stores and temples would be erected nearby, constituting the "emporium". Due to the nature of the Punic civilization, its relationship with the sea was fundamental and that the centre of the city, the agora, shouldn't have been located far from its economic centre. Experts have theorized that the canal was not used for navigation, but for landing in an area particularly hostile to human presence. The location of the Tofet of Salambo, in the vicinity of the centre of the original Phoenician colony, is a clear sign of this possible hostility according to the sections that have been discovered, dating from the 8th century BC.

There have been many discrepancies among the experts about the location of the primitive ports of Carthage. By analogy with other places, and taking into account the need to avoid unfavourable winds, the possible location of one of the ports is placed in the vicinity of the area of the Baths of Antoninus, towards the north of the site, (Note: According to a hypothesis formulated by Dr Carton in 1911 and cited by Lancel (2000, p. 242)) that is, towards the southern area of Le Kram. The discoveries made at the site suggest that this first location is very likely since the Roman baths used to be located on land reclaimed from the sea. Therefore, in this area could have been located one of the primitive ports of the city. Certain historians believe, however, that the site of the primitive port was in the vicinity of the village of Sidi Bou Saïd, because of its location near a cape, which gave it a privileged geographical position so important in the eyes of the Phoenicians. Other experts, including Serge Lancel, placed the position of the ports along the Lake of Tunis, less assembled in ancient times than nowadays. Lancel places the position of the port on the beaches of Marsa, at a relative distance from the city (about 3 km approximately), but close enough to the neighbourhood of Megara.

Regardless, it becomes essential to focus on the observation of the structures of which traces are preserved to see if it is possible to contrast their existence with ancient sources and thus obtain an approximate date of their construction.

== Military and commercial port ==
=== Description of Appian ===
Appian, an author of the 2nd century AD., was based on the work of Polybius, who witnessed the downfall of the city of Dido, and whose text has been lost. His description is very important, even if it sometimes raises more questions than answers. It is a text that deals with specific topics of ancient history.

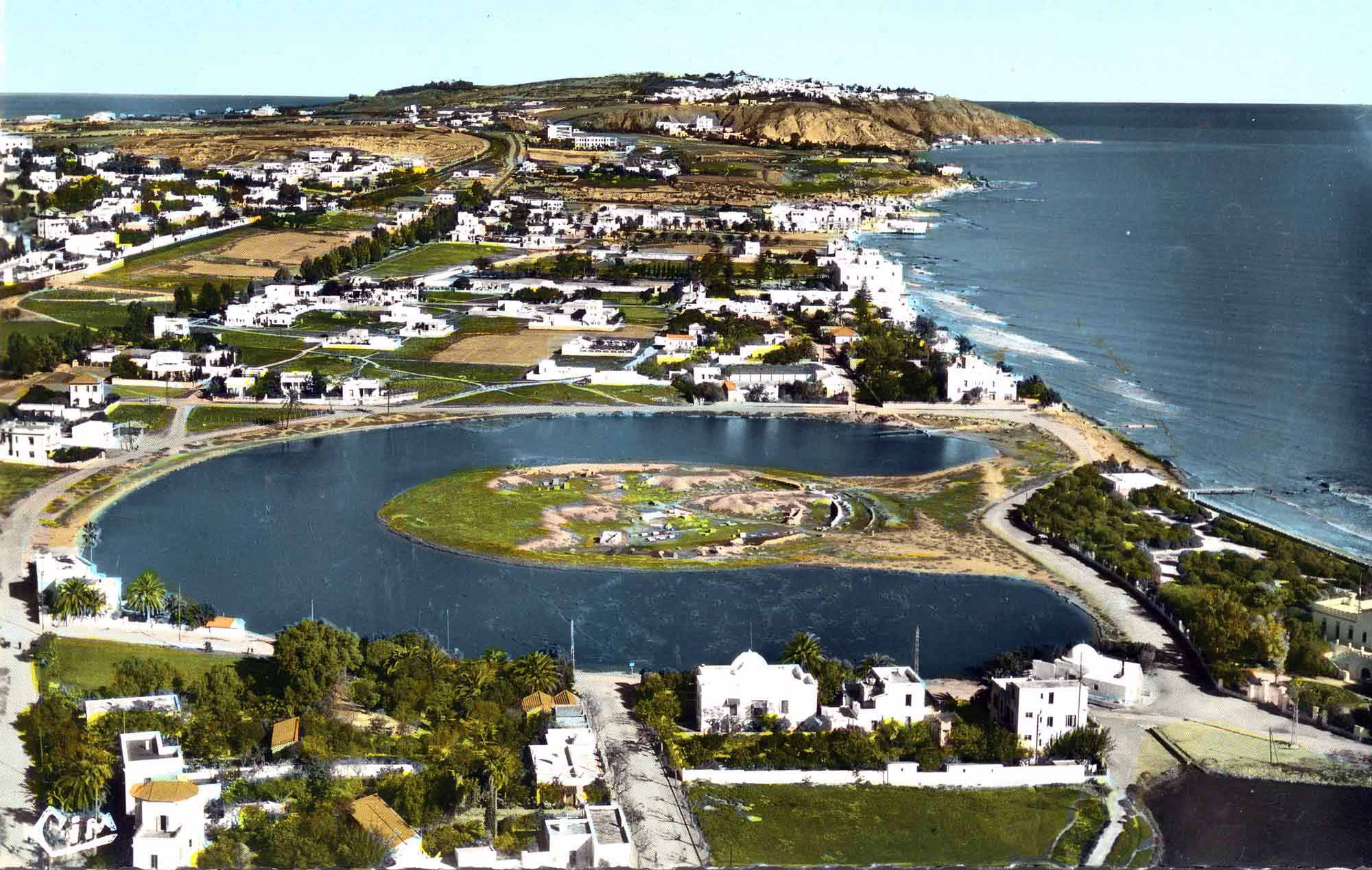
View of the ports (1958).

The ports of Carthage were arranged in such a way that ships could pass from one to the other; they were accessed from the sea through an entrance about 21 m wide, which was closed with an iron chain. The first port, reserved for merchant ships, was provided with numerous and varied moorings. In the middle of the inner harbour was an island. The island and the harbour were bordered by large ports. Along these ports were hangars, which could accommodate 220 warships, and above the hangars were erected warehouses for the rigging. In front of each hangar rose two Ionic columns, which gave the circumference of the harbor and the island the appearance of a portico. A pavilion was built on the island for the admiral, and from this building, the trumpet signals and herald calls were made. From there, the admiral exercised his vigilance. The island was located in front of the entrance and was at a higher altitude: thus the admiral could see what was happening at sea, while those arriving from beyond could not clearly distinguish the interior of the port. The arsenals were invisible even to merchant ships: they were surrounded by a double wall and equipped with gates, which allowed merchant ships to pass from the first port to the city without being able to pass through the arsenals. (Note: Lybica (96) quoted by Decret (1977, p. 65))

In addition to the two dársenas (Note: A structure built in a convenient direction, on the shore of the sea or of a navigable river, and used to facilitate the loading and unloading of goods and people and even, sometimes, for sheltering ships.) surrounded by fortifications, Appian also mentions a large breakwater and a large foreshore.

The present site of the circular lagoon has an area of about eight hectares, the other lagoon is about twice as large. (Note: Measurements carried out by Charles Ernest Beulé and collected by Fantar (1993, p. 128)) The commercial port was connected to the sea by a canal, which must have flowed into the present-day Kram Bay, of which no remains exist.

Appian cites the term "cothon" to designate the ports, a word of Semitic origin that designates an artificial dársena created by men. Such spaces are relatively well known in other Punic cities, such as Motya, in Sicily, or Mahdia, in Tunisia. Strabo also provides data on the distance from the Carthage Ports to Cape Lillibaeus, (Note: Cape Lilibeo, together with Pachinus and Celorias, were the three promontories, from which arose Trinacria, the ancient name of Sicily (from Ancient Greek tria-"three" / ákra "cape, promontory"). Cf. Thucydides, History of the Peloponnesian War, vi.2.2; Ephorus of Cyme in FGrH 70 F 137b.) a promontory southeast of Sicily, which he estimates at 1500 stadia (277.5 km). (Note: Strabo, Geography of Strabo vi. 2.1.) The literary tradition has been verified by archaeology. Archaeologists have made models reconstructing the archaeological site in the different epochs of the city's history. These models are exhibited in the small museum of the Admiralty Islet.

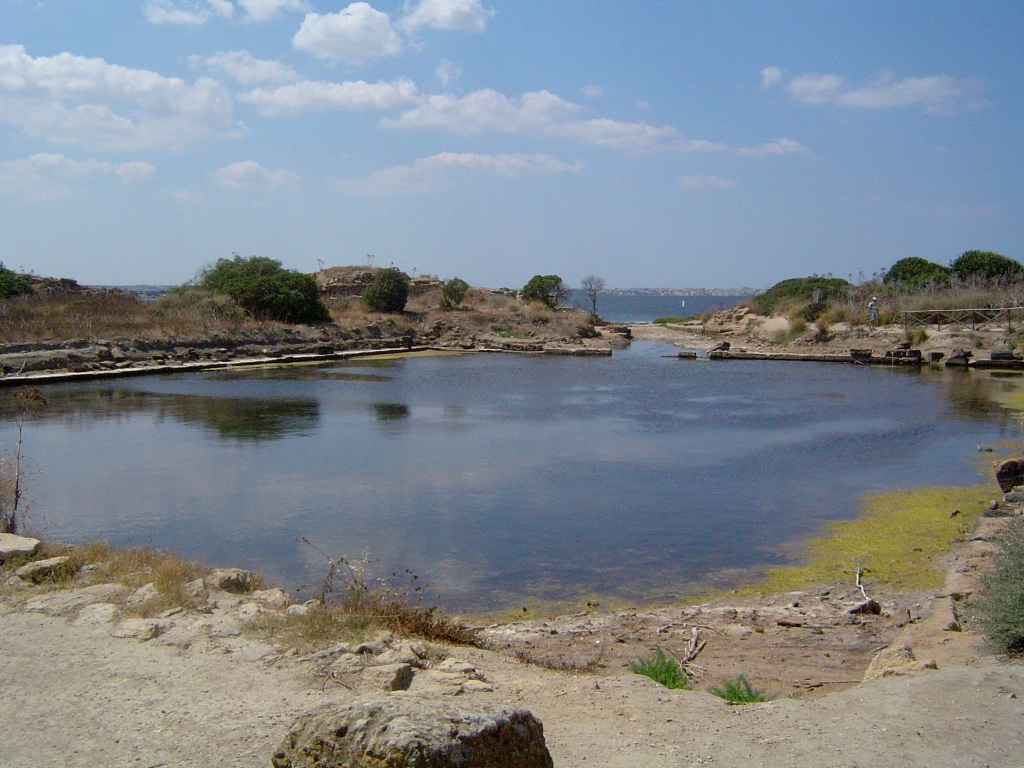
View of the "cothon" of Motya, Sicily.

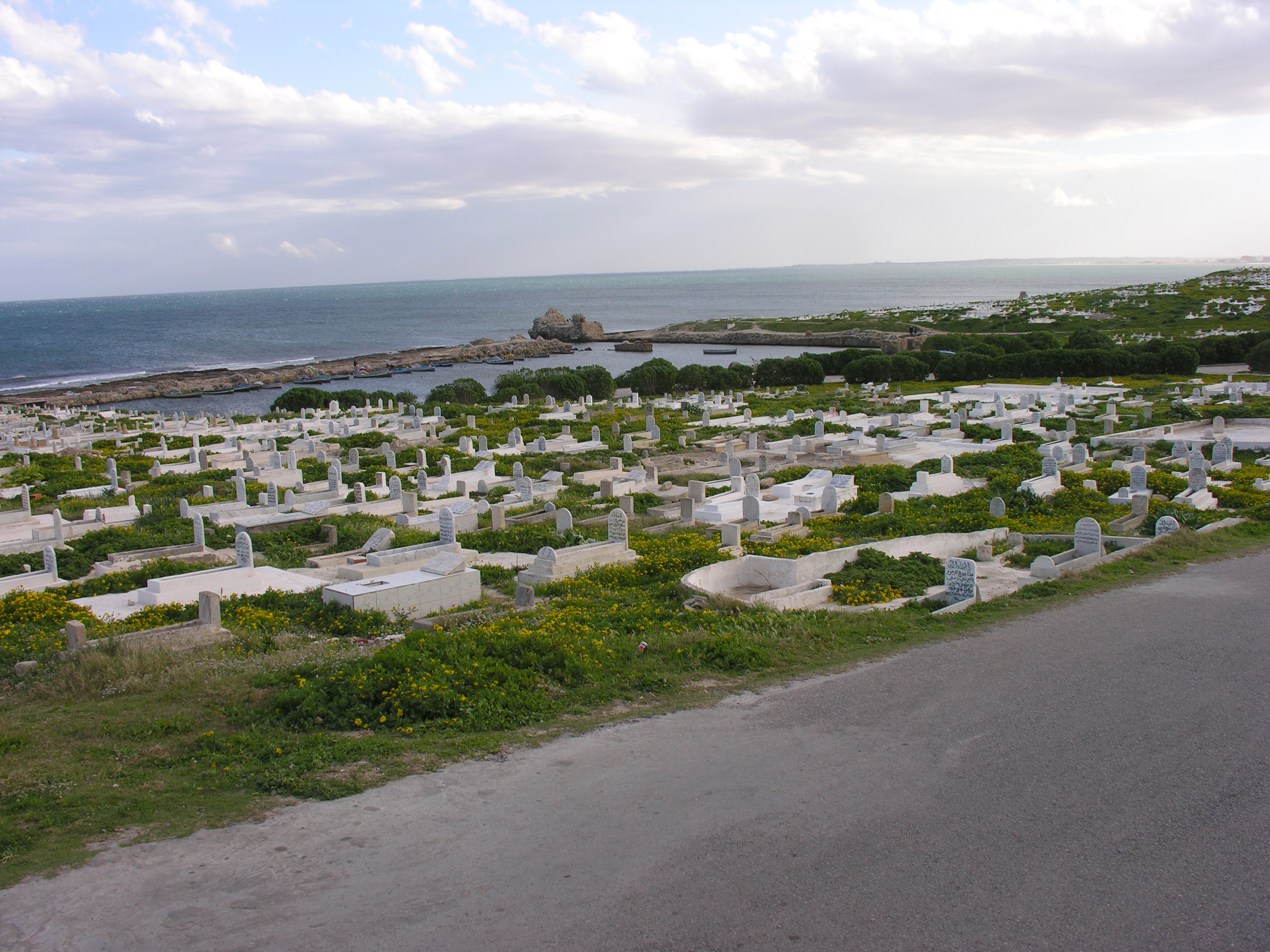
View of the marine cemetery in front of the "cothon" of Madhia.

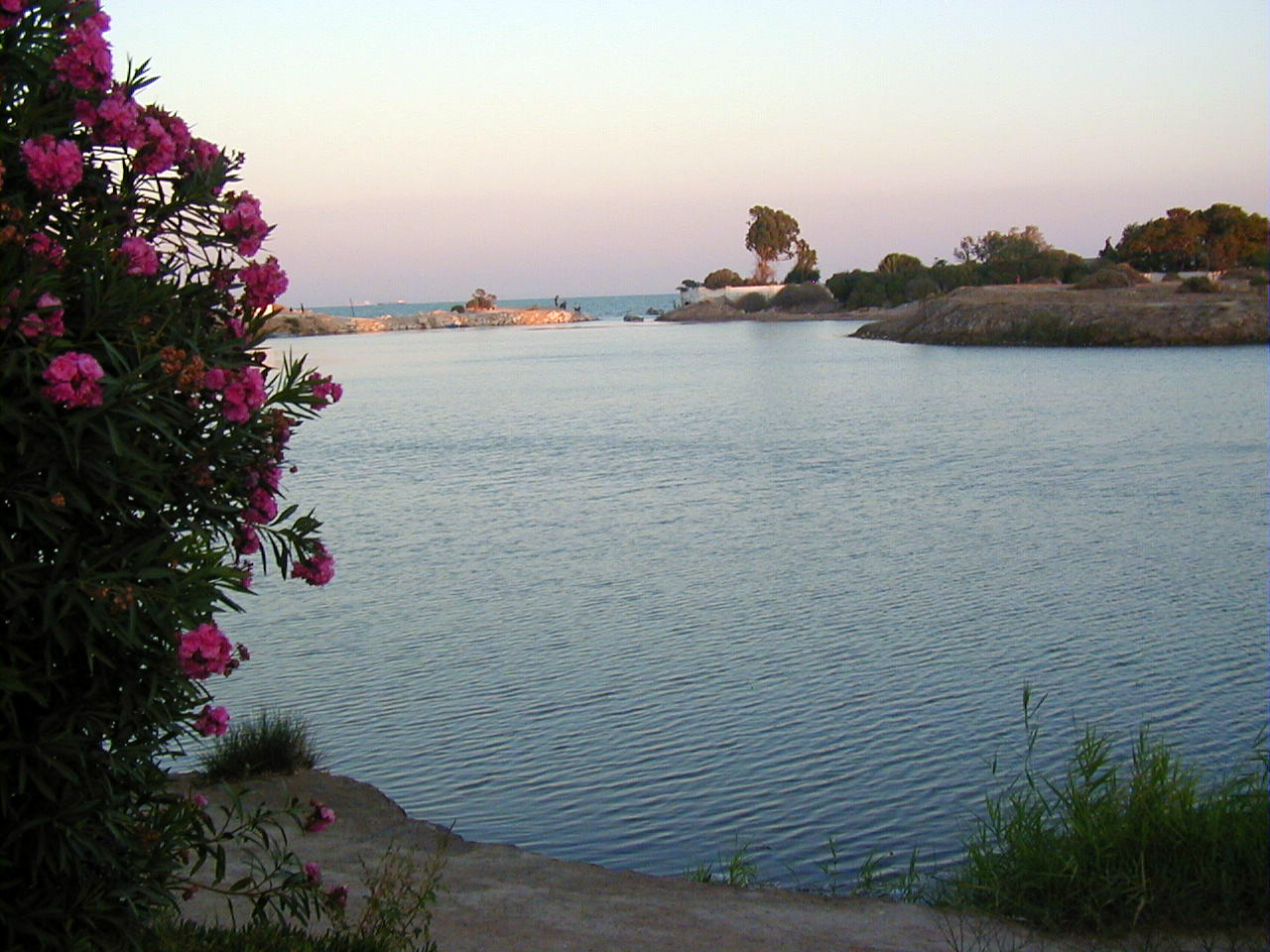
View of the Admiralty Islet from the circular port of Carthage.

=== Admiralty Islet ===
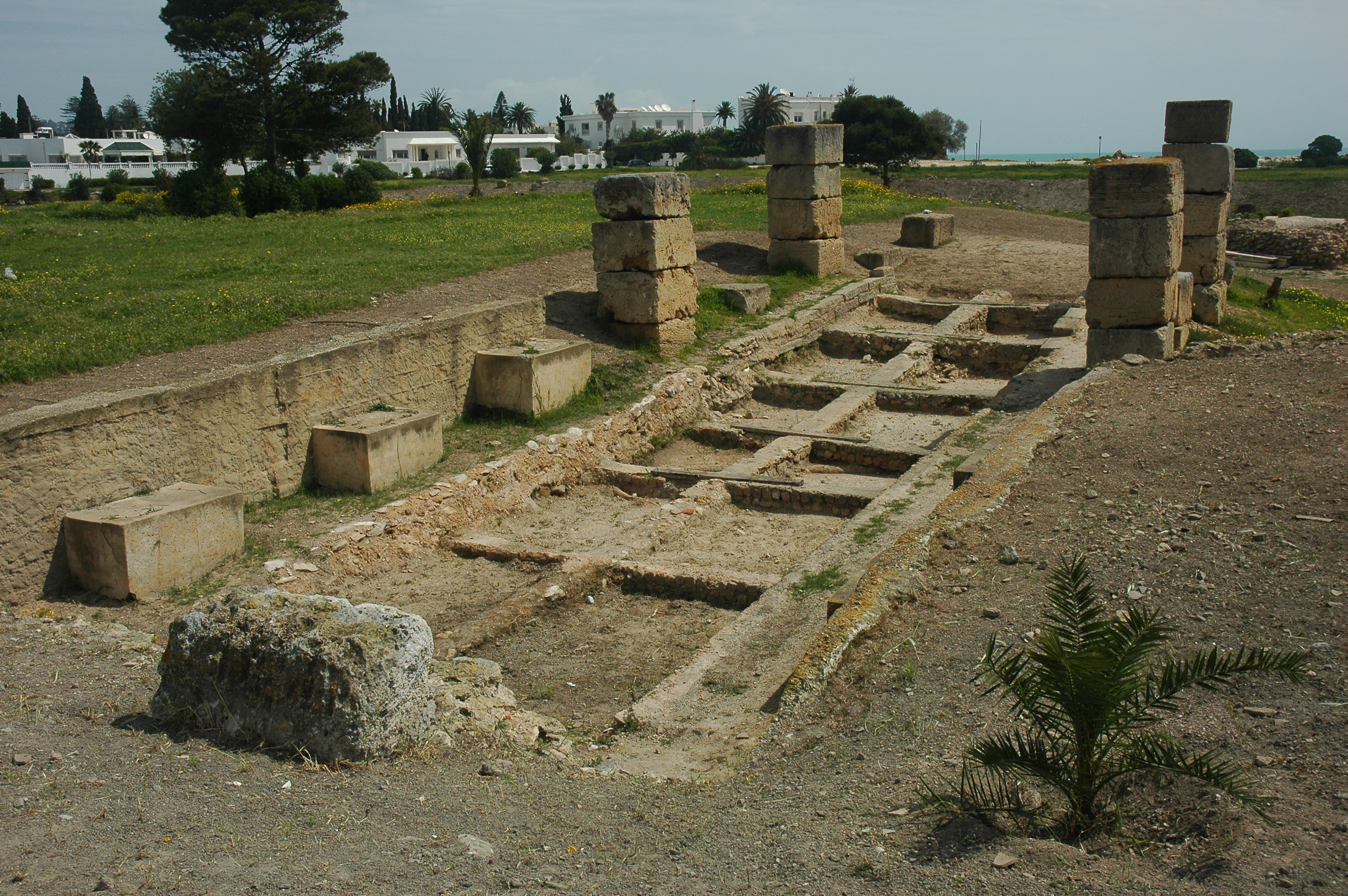
Dársena levees.

At first glance, it is difficult to identify the circular lagoon as the circular port of ancient Carthage in which a fleet that shook the western Mediterranean basin was sheltered.

A priori it is difficult to see how they could have had 220 ships there, such as the quinqueremes, ships with five oarsmen divided into three rows. However, British excavations have revealed that the circular lagoon was the military port and that the navarch's flag must have been on the islet. Punic ports have been found, particularly the ramps of the dársena levees or dry docks for wintering. The ramps had a slightly sloping beaten earth floor. These dársenas were undoubtedly the warehouses fitted out to accommodate the ships mentioned by Strabo.

The archaeological remains uncovered made it possible to extrapolate the site's reception capacity: 30 levees on the circular islet and 135 to 140 levees around the perimeter. In total, 160 to 170 levees could accommodate as many warships as have been identified. Below the dársena levees were located the storage spaces. It has been assumed that each levee could accommodate two rows of ships. In the middle of the circular islet was an open space, next to which stood a tower, which is likely to be the tower of the navarch mentioned by Appian.

It has been pointed out that the levees could have served mainly as a naval shipyard, and that all the ships did not need to be operated at the same time. On the other hand, agglomerations should only take place during winter.

=== Commercial port ===
The two ports were connected by a canal, at the entrance of which, according to another text by Appian, an esplanade was used to store goods. An American mission proceeded to carry out a series of excavations in that area and found the remains of part of a dock dating from the second half of the 3rd century BC. The excavations also revealed a series of port facilities: docks and hangars, which were in the vicinity of the commercial port.

A channel led from the port to the sea and ended near the foreshore, called "Falbe's quadrilateral", after the name of the 19th century Danish archaeologist who was the first to study it. The foreshore communicated with the maritime wall of the 2nd century BC. A careful study led to classify this space as an embankment or "chôma". In connection with the text of Appian, one can certainly recognize, in this embankment, the space for manoeuvring, unloading and storage that protected the entrance from the prevailing winds. It was perhaps in these places where the Roman army set foot during the Third Punic War, constituting the bridgehead from which the final assault started.

== Conclusion ==
=== Role of ports during the downfall of Carthage ===
The organization of the Carthage Punic Ports in its last epoch was arranged in such a costly way and directed with an ambition based on a renewed force that violated the peace signed in 201 BC, provoking the Roman Senate to use force against the Carthaginians.

Located at the southern end of the city, the ports of the city were protected by a device of walls notably lighter than the one protecting the isthmus, since the Carthaginians were confident of their naval superiority. Carthage thought it was impossible for them to receive an attack from the sea, as they were prepared to repel any incursion. The final assault led by the Roman general Publius Cornelius Scipio Aemilianus came, however, from the harbour quarter (146 BC). Setting fire to the levees in the eastern part of the commercial port, Scipio seized the military port threatening the agora. This attack occurred in the final assault on the hill of Byrsa. The situation of the ports suffered the same fate as the rest of the city after its fall and were subsequently used during the Roman domination.

=== Ports location in Roman times ===
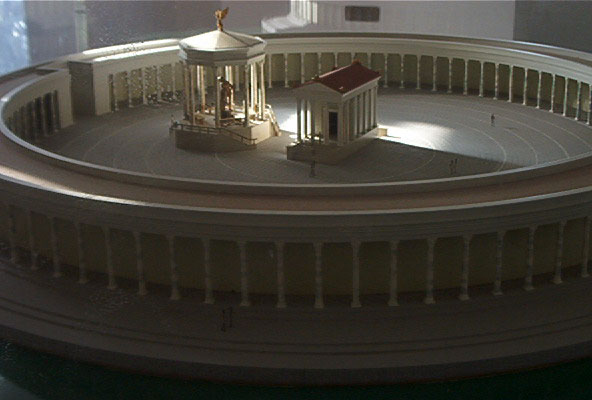
Admiralty islet in Roman times.

The Admiralty Islet during Roman rule was occupied by a public square enclosed by columns. On it were erected a temple and an octagonal building, whose use is unknown. The mercantile activities that took place in the Carthage commercial port during Roman control were fundamental for the provisioning of Rome.

In 306 the city suffered an earthquake that severely devastated the littoral zone. This earthquake was so strong that it took a long time for the city to recover from the disaster. Although port activities continued, the topography of the site had changed extensively.

=== What happened to the ports ===
The complexity of this issue has been clarified, although many areas remain obscure. Serge Lancel quotes Cicero, who speaks of the destruction of Carthage in this way in his work (De lege agraria, II, 32, 87), despite the fact that "it had strong walls and was surrounded by ports".

The places where ports should be located depends on their orientation to the winds, which would notably influence their use. The places recognized as the possible locations of the ports are the following:

- An inlet mentioned by Hamilcar Barca. (Note: Based on the work of St. Augustine, Confessions, V, 8, 15 quoted by Lancel (2000, p. 263))
- A dársena between the cove of Hamilcar and the hill of Bordj Djedid. (Note: Dr. Carton's hypothesis reported by Lancel (2000, p. 264))
- An inlet close to the area where the Baths of Antoninus are located, called "Quadrilateral of Roquefeuil". (Note: Also based on a hypothesis by Dr Carton, which was reported by Lancel (2000, pp. 264–265))

The beaches of La Marsa could also represent the merchant landing sites.

== Bibliography ==
- Beschaouch, Azedine (1993). La légende de Carthage. Découvertes Gallimard (in French). Vol. 172. Paris: Gallimard. ISBN 2070532127.
- Decret, François (1977). Carthage ou l'empire de la mer (in French). Paris: Éd. du Seuil (Points Histoire). ISBN 2020047128.
- Ennabli, Abdelmajid; Slim, Hédi (1993). Carthage. Le site archéologique (in French). Tunisia: Cérès. ISBN 997370083X.
- Fantar, M'hamed Hassine (1993). Carthage. Approche d'une civilisation (in French). Tunisia: Alif. ISBN 9780012452578.
- Fantar, M'hamed Hassine (1997). "Afrique du Nord". Les Phéniciens (in French). Paris: Éd. Stock. p. 210.
- Golvin, Jean-Claude (2003). L'Antiquité retrouvée (in French). Paris: Errance. ISBN 287772266X.
- Gras, Michel; Rouillard, Pierre; Teixidor, Javier (1994). L'univers phénicien (in French). Paris: Arthaud. ISBN 2700307321.
- Lancel, Serge (2000). Carthage (in French). Tunisia: Cérès. ISBN 9973194209.
- Moscati, Sabatino (1997). Les Phéniciens (in French). Paris: Stock. ISBN 2234048192.
- Slim, Hédi; Fauqué, Nicolas (2001). La Tunisie antique. De Hannibal à saint Augustin (in French). Paris: Mengès. ISBN 285620421X.
