= Chapelle Saint-Louis de Carthage =

Former Catholic church in Carthage, Tunisia

Coordinates: 36.8530°N 10.3249°E

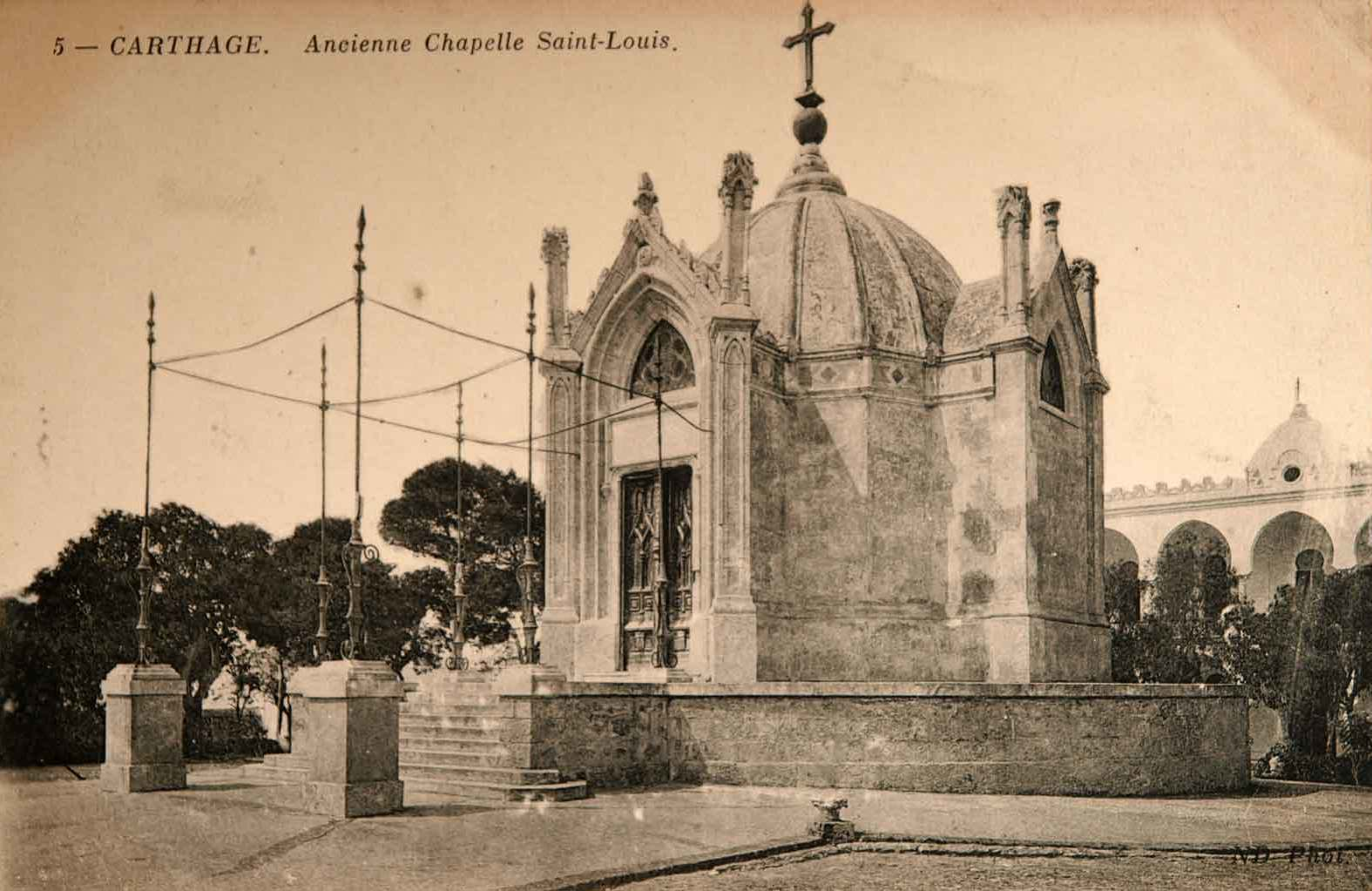
- Chapelle Saint-Louis in 1888
- Chapelle Saint-Louis de Carthage
- Location: Carthage
- Country: Tunisia
- Denomination: Roman Catholic Church

Architecture
- Architect: Charles Jourdain
- Architectural type: church
- Style: Neogothic
- Groundbreaking: 1840
- Completed: 1841
- Demolished: 1950

The Chapelle Saint-Louis de Carthage was a Roman Catholic church located in Carthage, Tunisia. It was built between 1840 and 1841 on land donated by the Bey of Tunis to the King of France in 1830. The chapel was located atop Byrsa Hill, at the heart of the Archaeological Site of Carthage, until it was destroyed in 1950.

== History ==
=== Construction ===
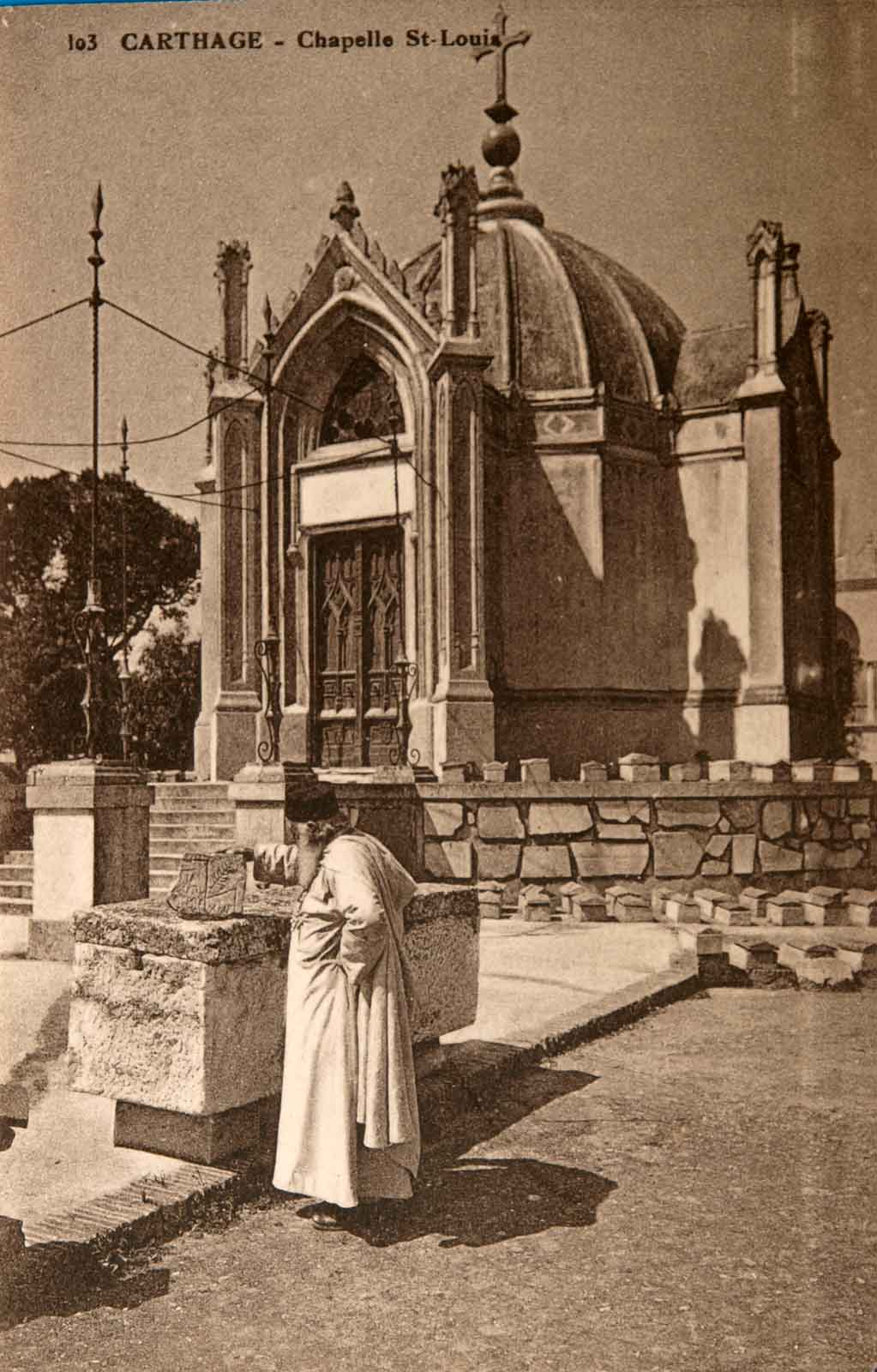
Alfred Louis Delattre in front of the chapel

On 8 August 1830, Hussein II Bey signed an act granting land for the purpose of honoring Louis IX "at the location of the prince's death [at] La Malka". This act confirmed old treaties concluded between France and Tunisia.

On account of the political difficulties related to the abdication of Charles X and the death of Hussein II in 1835, the act did not enter into force until 1840, after the terms had been confirmed by Ahmed I Bey. The location was chosen beforehand by the consular agent Jules de Lesseps, son of the consul general of France Mathieu de Lesseps: it is the site of the ancient Punic temple of Eshmoun on the Byrsa, which was renamed "Mount Louis-Philippe".

Thus, the first block of the building, designed by Charles Jourdain, was placed on the 25 August 1840. Though it had been used since 1841, the chapel was formally consecrated on 25 August 1845 by Mgr Sutter. The modest building designed to house the priest was not used for this purpose; it served as the original archaeological museum for the site.

=== Operation ===
The chapel served to commemorate the death of St Louis every year on 25 August. The place also served as the place of prayer for French sailors on leave in La Goulette.

The installation of a religious order was begun in 1844 and came to fruition on 13 June 1875 with the arrival of a small community of White Fathers from Cardinal Lavigerie, consisting of two fathers and a friar. From November 1875, the archaeologist Alfred Louis Delattre was a member of the community.

Life in the chapel was difficult, on account of its relative remoteness from supply points, as well as the roughness of the access routes. In addition to providing medical services to the local population, the White Fathers were placed in charge of archaeological activities by Lavigerie. The work of Delattre led to the creation of the musée Lavigerie, which contained 6,347 items in 1881.

From 1860, the lack of maintenance of the chapel by France was noted by Victor Guérin. This was remedied in 1875, on the occasion of the visit of the Governor General of Algeria, Alfred Chanzy.

Conflict arose between France and Tunisia on account of the entry of Mustapha Ben Ismaïl into the chapel enclosure, leading to a "demand for a public and official apology."

=== Closure ===
In 1881 it was decided to build a basilica on the site; Lavigerie launch an appeal for donations for this purpose. The first stone was finally laid in 1884. This cathedral was consecrated on 15 May 1890. However the chapel continued in use, with the First World War seeing a renewal of worship there.

In November 1910, renovations were carried out, then again in 1925 thanks to Louis Poinssot. The chapel was visited by Gaston Doumergue in 1931. The centenary of the chapel was celebrated in 1940 by a gathering of important Franco-Tunisian people and descendants of people who had been present at the original groundbreaking ceremony.

The chapel was closed to the public in 1943. An architect was called in to evaluate the work needed offered a quote and suggested replacing the building. The Resident-General forwarded these opinions to the Ministry of Foreign Affairs on 4 September 1947. Some funds were allocated for the work and the demolition of the chapel began on 11 January 1950.

== Architecture and decoration ==
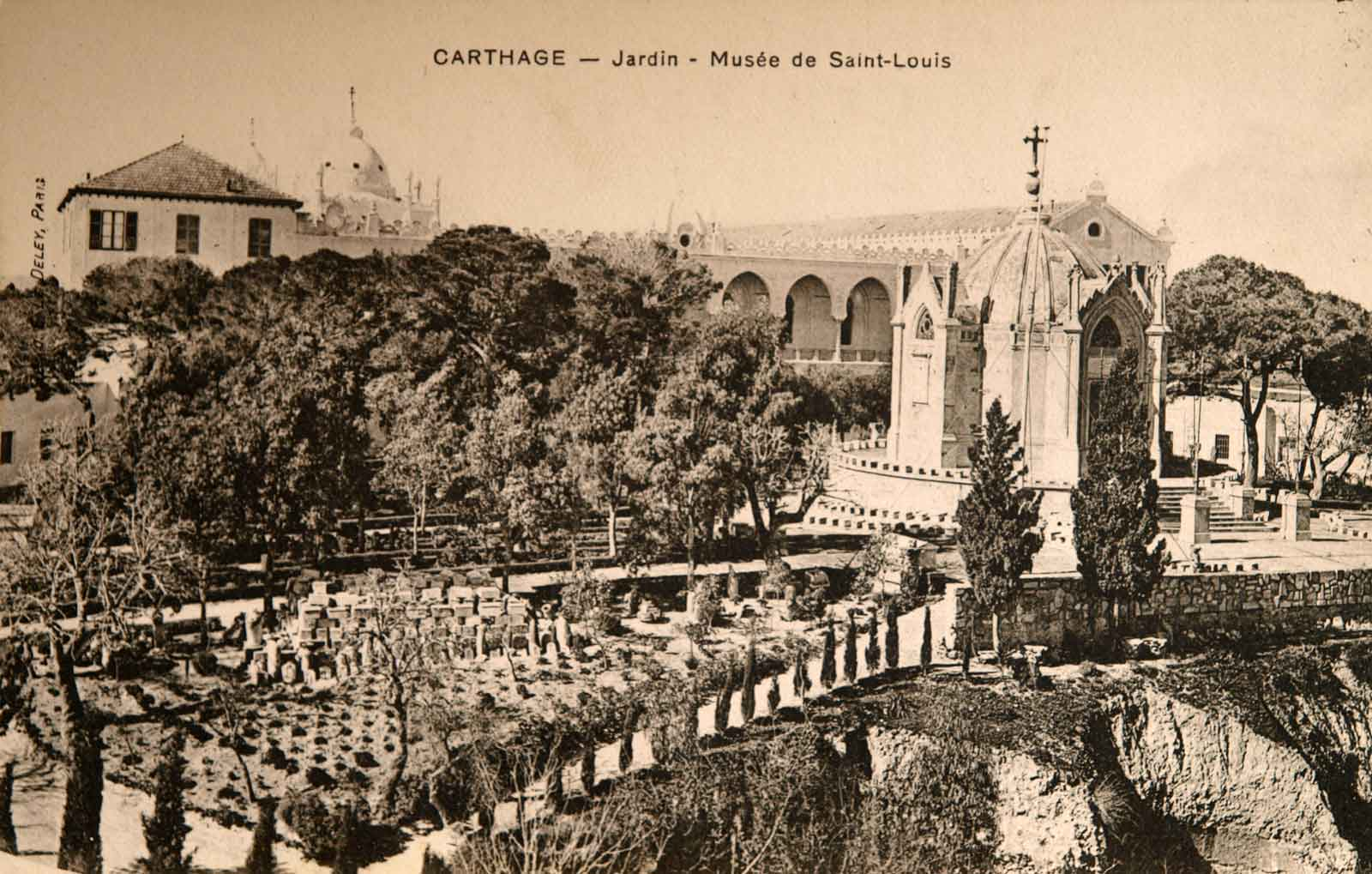
Chapel with surrounding garden on an old postcard

The plan is inspired by that of the Chapelle royale de Dreux. The materials were found on location, except for the dome which was built in brick.

A statue of Louis IX, carved by Charles Émile Seurre, was sent by the king of France and installed on 11 August 1841. The initial plans foresaw the planting of 200 cypress trees around the building; this was not brought to fulfillment. The garden of the chapel was further devastated by a storm in December 1931.

The chapel was located in an enclosure. On the wall of the gallery where it abutted the garden, there were displays of ancient items recovered during the construction of the foundations and in the surrounding area.

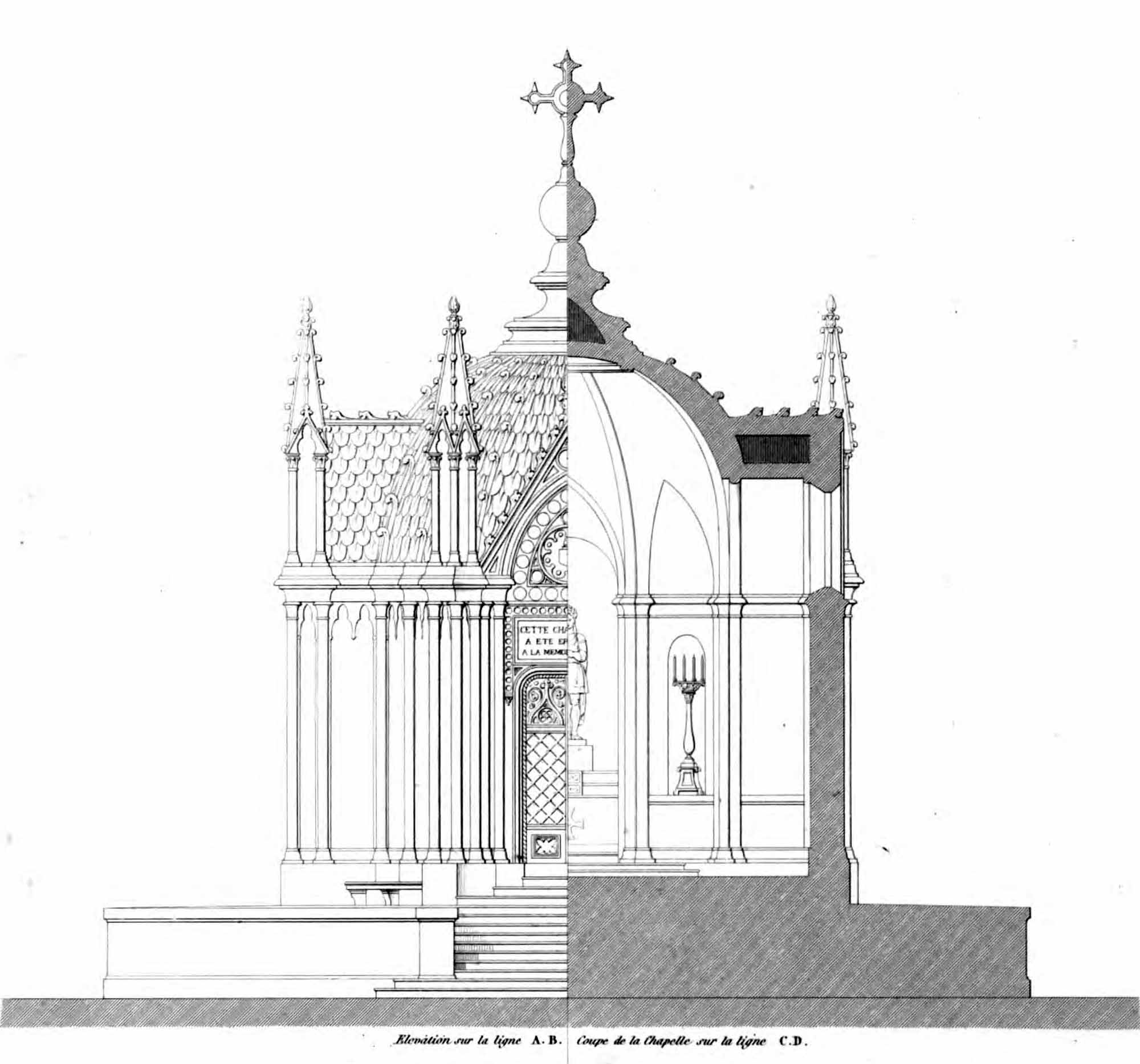
Section of the chapel

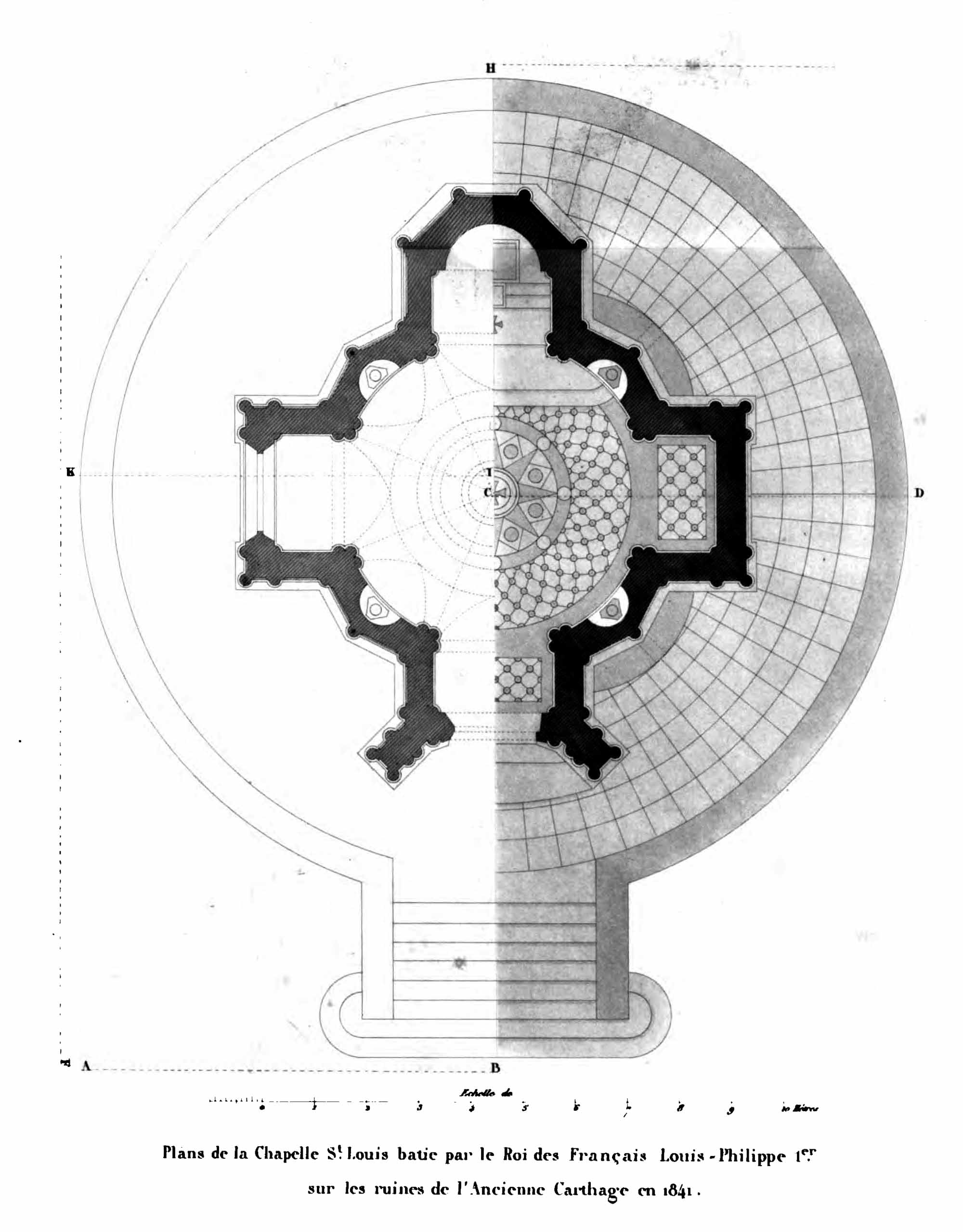
Plan of the chapel

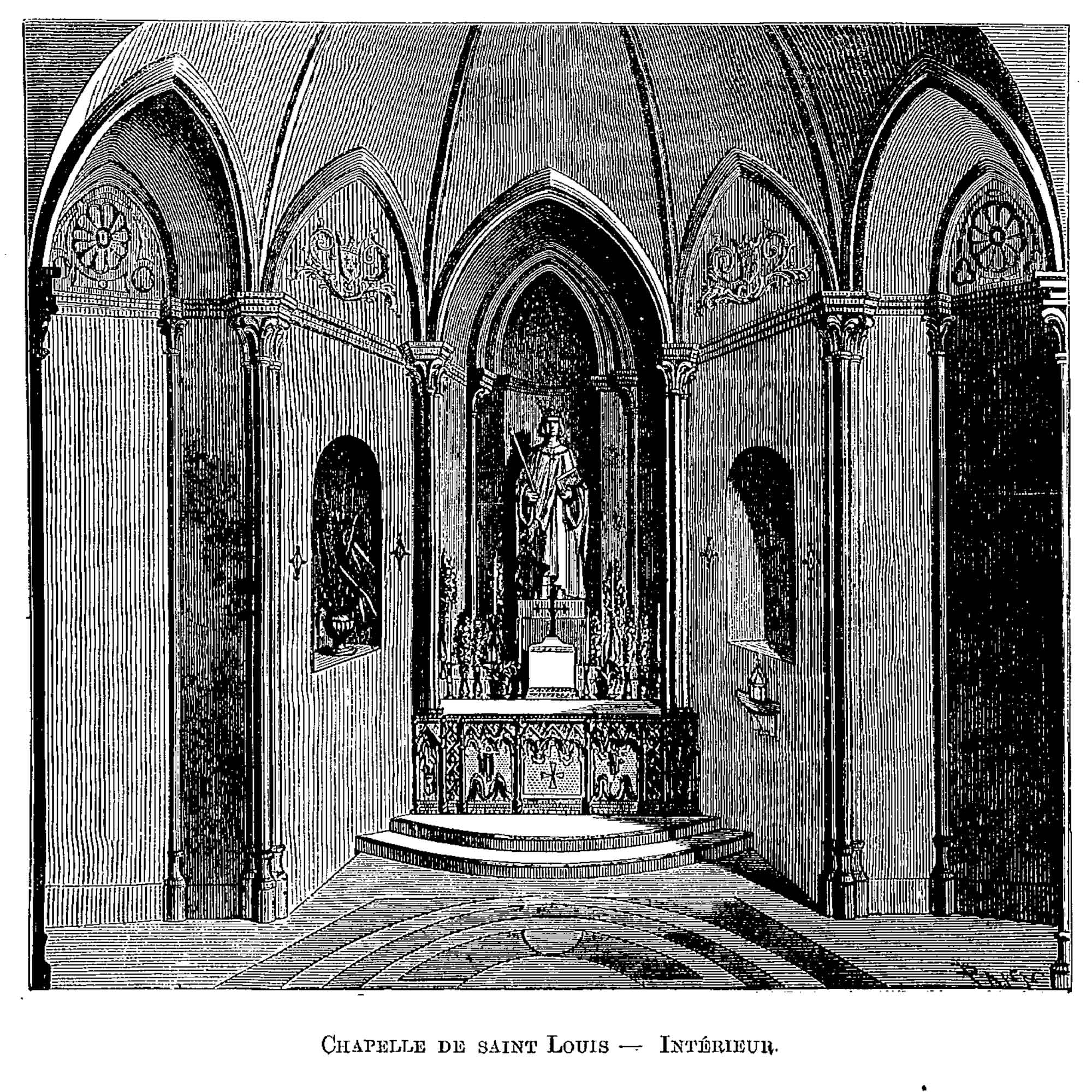
Interior of the chapel

== See also ==
- Cathedral of St. Vincent de Paul

== Bibliography ==
- Pierre Gandolphe, « Saint-Louis de Carthage », Cahiers de Byrsa, vol. I, 1951, pp. 269–306

- Media related to Category:Chapel of Saint Louis of Carthage at Wikimedia Commons
- Saint Louis Cathedral (Carthage)
