= Sidi Ghrib =

Tunisian archaeological site

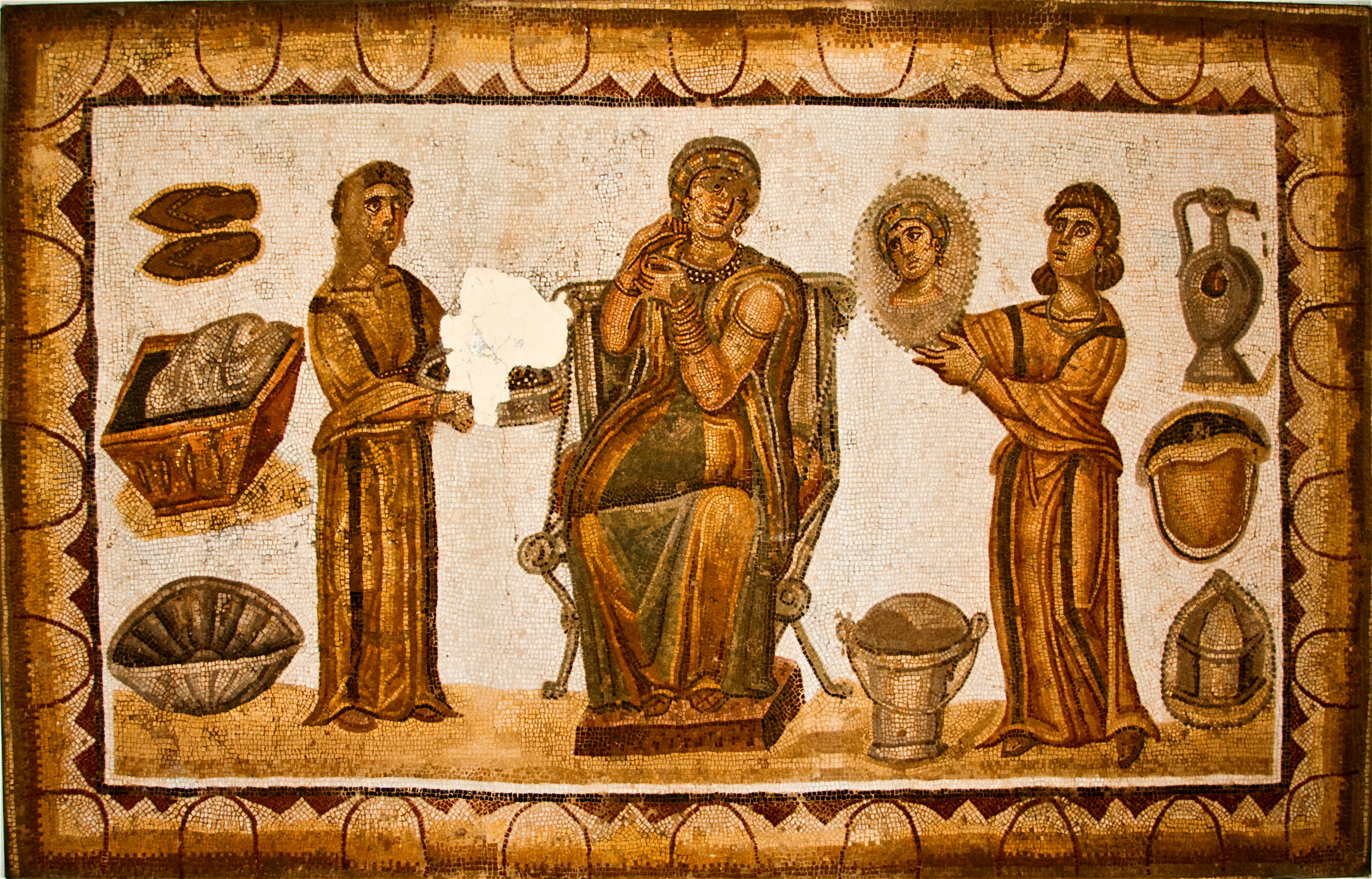
Mosaic Matrone at his toilet at the National Museum of Bardo

Sidi Ghrib is a Tunisian archaeological site about 40 kilometers (25 mi) southwest of Carthage and four kilometers (2.5 mi) from Borj El Amri, known for its beautiful Roman mosaics.

== Archaeology ==
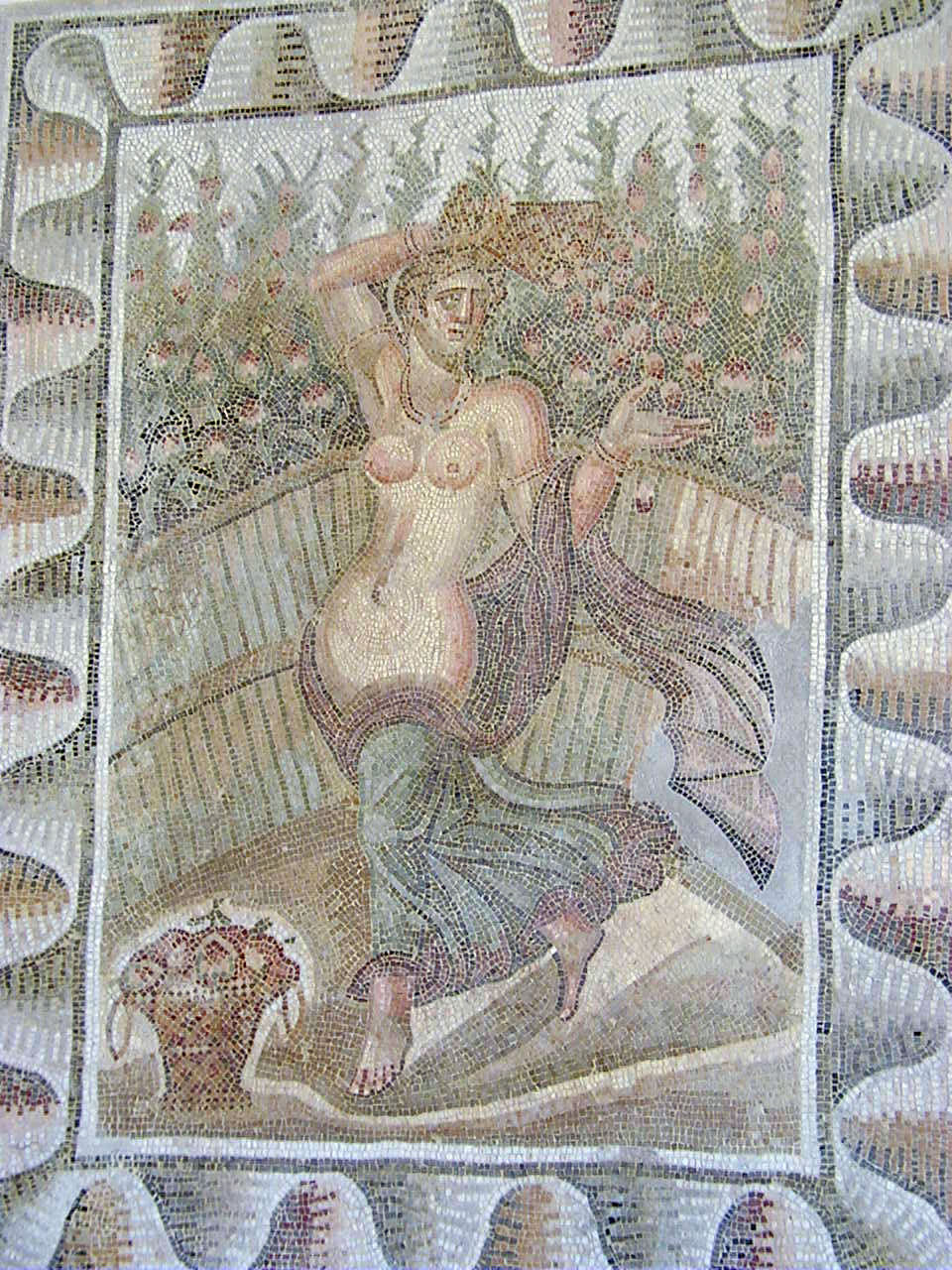
Sidi Ghrib Rosegarden mosaic

The site was searched in 1975. The study by Abdelmajid Ennabli showed that the site was a Roman villa of the late 4th or early 5th century. The thermal baths at the site formed part of the villa and were therefore private. With a total area of 780 m^{2} (8,400 sq ft), they measure 28 by 29 meters (92 by 95 ft), around a frigidarium of about 8.5 by 9.5 meters (28 by 31 ft).

=== Description of the mosaics ===
1. Matron at her toilette, displayed at the National Museum of Bardo, is a mosaic representing the domina, the mistress of house, occupied with her toilet and surrounded by two maidservants of which one holds a mirror and the other carries a basket containing various jewels. At the end of the mosaic, the artist presented the necessary accessories for the bath: a pair of sandals, a basket of linen, a pitcher, etc.;
2. Master of the house leaving for the hunting exhibition at the presidential palace of Carthage.

These representations with the aim of social affirmation are frequent at the end of antiquity.
