= Alfred Louis Delattre =

French archaeologist (1850–1932)

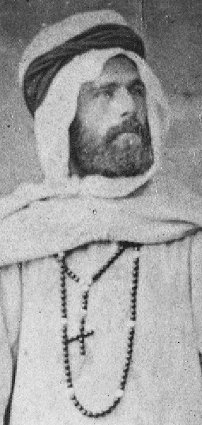
Alfred Louis Delattre

Alfred Louis Delattre (26 June 1850 – 12 January 1932), also known as Révérend Père Delattre, was a French archaeologist, born at Déville-lès-Rouen. Delattre made substantial discoveries in the ruins of ancient Carthage including an ancient Necropolis.

Sent as a missionary to Algeria, he became chaplain of the church of St. Louis of Carthage and conservator of the archaeological museum at Algiers. His investigations among the ruins of ancient Carthage were very valuable. He became director of the Musée Lavigerie de Saint-Louis de Carthage, founded through his efforts in 1875. His works include:

- Carthage et la Tunisie au point de vue archéologique (1883)
- Inscriptions de Carthage (1884–85)
- Souvenirs de la croisade de Saint Louis trouvés à Carthage (1888)
- Les tombeaux puniques de Carthage (1890)
- Souvenirs de l'ancienne église d'Afrique (1893)
- Musée Lavigerie de Saint-Louis de Carthage (three volumes, 1899–1900)

== Literature ==
For his articles in periodicals, consult Marquis d'Anselme de Puisaye, Étude sur les diverses publications du Révérend Père Delattre (Paris, 1895).
