= Archaeological site of Carthage =

Archaeological Site of Carthage
UNESCO World Heritage Site
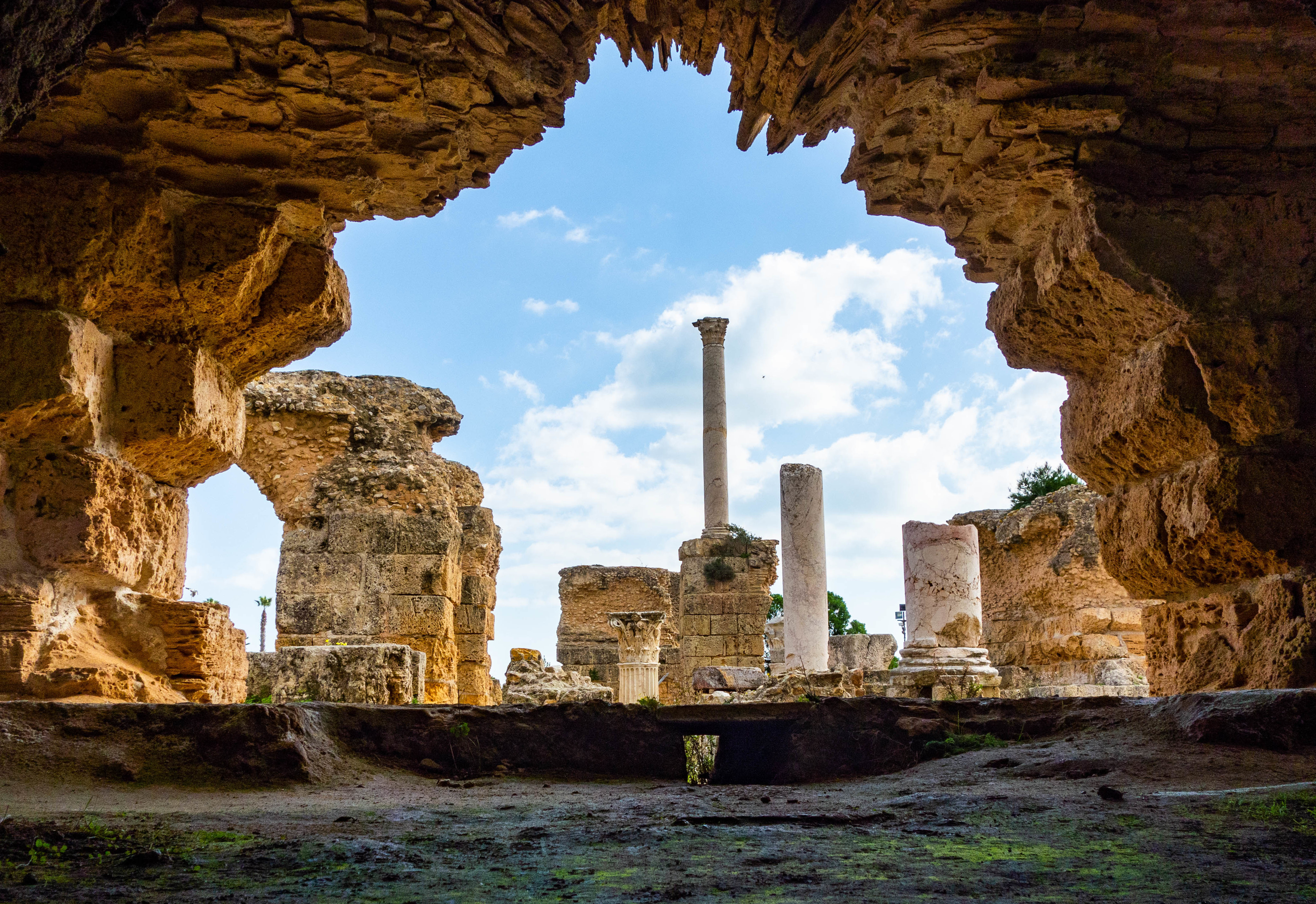
- Baths of Antoninus ,Carthage
- Interactive map of Archaeological Site of Carthage
- Location: Tunisia
- Criteria: (ii) (iii) (vi)
- Reference: 37
- Inscription: 1979 (3rd Session)
- Extensions: 498.08 ha
- Coordinates: 36.91°N 10.28°E

Archaeological site of Carthage
- Interactive map of Archaeological site of Carthage

History
- Built: 814 BC

The Archaeological Site of Carthage is a site dispersed in the current city of Carthage (Tunisia) and classified as part of the World Heritage by UNESCO since 1979.

It is dominated by the hill of Byrsa, which was the center of the Punic city. Today, it is distinguished by the massive silhouette of the Acropolium, built at the end of the 19th century on the presumed site of the tomb of King Louis IX (Saint Louis), who died there during the Eighth Crusade. Near the cathedral, opposite this empty tomb whose remains were repatriated to France, are the remains of the most important quarter of the city. Only a few foundations and some fragments of columns remain, but one can gauge the power that emanated from the city at that time: immense dimensions, large spaces, panoramic views, and the organization of the streets.

The rapid development of the modern city, risking the destruction of the remains forever, led prominent Tunisian archaeologists to alert public opinion, and UNESCO launched a vast international campaign between 1972 and 1992 to save Carthage. This turning point was completed with its classification as a World Heritage Site.

This article will only address the current state of the archaeological site, a large number of elements having been lost in ancient or more recent times. The difficulty for visitors now lies in the extreme dispersion of the remains, even though some clusters can be distinguished. For the city and the country, the challenge is more complex: to protect the testimonies of the past while minimizing disruption to the daily life of the population.

== Geography ==
=== Location ===
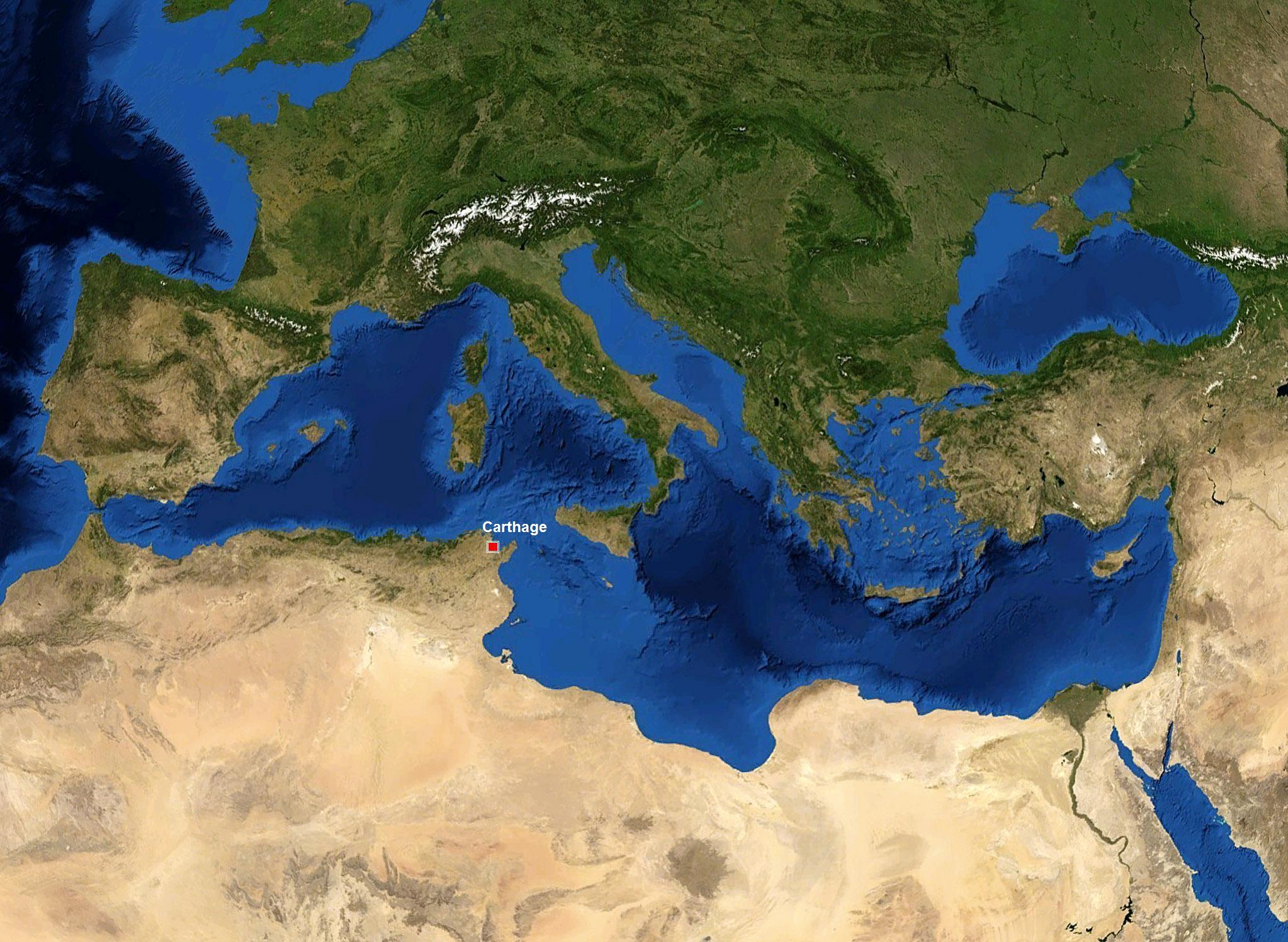
Location of Carthage at the center of the Mediterranean Basin.

"History attaches itself to the places it has once chosen," according to Serge Lancel. It must be acknowledged that geography played a significant role in Carthage's role, with the great city being compared to a "ship at anchor" by Strabo. The location of cities among the Phoenicians responded to the dual requirement of openness to the sea and protection from the interior lands. The foundations of Tyre, Sidon, and Gades followed this pattern

More than the older colony of Utica, Carthage appears favored by geography. It is located at the border of the two basins of the Mediterranean Sea, thus in a very conducive location for trade. At the bottom of the Gulf of Tunis, facing Jebel Boukornine, ancient Carthage presents itself as a promontory barred by hills, the main one being Byrsa, a territory easy to defend and bordered by the sea on three of its sides. Polybius speaks of it as a "peninsula almost entirely surrounded either by the sea ("the Sebkha Ariana was not yet closed and formed a bay"), or by a lake and connected to the continent by an isthmus barred and by a chain of difficult-to-cross hills"

Protected on the sea side, the city also appears preserved by the hills and by the Lake of Tunis, with the presence of two sebkhas reinforcing this particularity.

Location of the site's components
Components	Coordinates	Components	Coordinates
Amphitheater	36°51′22.01″N 10°18′53.88″E	Basilica of Damous El Karita	36°51′41.59″N 10°19′51.72″E
Basilica of Dermech	36°50′55.13″N 10°19′30.99″E	Basilica of Saint Cyprian	36°51′49.97″N 10°20′15.16″E
Basilica Majorum	36°52′3.87″N 10°19′58.98″E	Cisterns of La Malga	36°51′33.53″N 10°19′8.07″E
Columned building	36°51′23.45″N 10°19′31.25″E	Admiralty islet	36°50′42.07″N 10°19′31.82″E
Circular monument	36°51′27.25″N 10°19′40.75″E	Punic necropolises	36°51′18.26″N 10°19′55.89″E
Odeon	36°51′31.7″N 10°19′49.82″E	Commercial port	36°50′29.8″N 10°19′29.86″E
Military port	36°50′44.91″N 10°19′34.14″E	Magon quarter	36°51′4.6″N 10°19′52.14″E
Punic quarter of Byrsa	36°51′8.46″N 10°19′26.3″E	Rotunda of Damous El Karita	36°51′39.03″N 10°19′48.09″E
Theater	36°51′27.93″N 10°19′46.12″E	Antonine Baths	36°51′18.26″N 10°19′55.89″E
Tophet of Salammbô	36°50′28.5″N 10°19′21.59″E	Roman villas	36°51′26.64″N 10°19′53.96″E

=== Soil characteristics ===
Although the site does not have many complete buildings, the ground is littered with fragments of the most precious marbles. Among these fragments are two or three varieties of white statuary marble – probably from the quarries of Paros and Luni – and a variety of Pentelic marble, several varieties of cipollino marble, many fragments of yellow Siena marble, Pavonazzo marble, porphyry feldspar in large quantities – sometimes in blocks of several cubic feet – and pink Egyptian porphyry.

Pacho thinks that, like in Cyrene, the territory of Carthage does not offer precious materials but rather materials, such as marble, porphyry, and granite, foreign to the city and imported from afar. De Buch, a learned geologist from Berlin, and Mesnard de La Groye, a former geology teacher at the Collège de France, having studied these fragments, believe they come from quarries in Italy and Greece.

Notes on Cyrenaica by Frederick William Beechey report around Carthage the presence of a conglomerate of sandstone and a limestone without fossils and therefore not very solid.

== History and rediscovery of the site ==
The great African city experienced rapid expansion as a civilization of the Mediterranean melting pot specific to Phoenician culture, then this growth was brutally halted, but the city managed to be reborn through the will of the Roman victors and thanks to its exceptional location. Nevertheless, in the turmoil of the divisions of the Mediterranean world, Carthage passed into the background: first pillaged, then forgotten, leading Gustave Flaubert to write in a letter to Ernest Feydeau in October 1858 that "we know nothing about Carthage."

It took the tenacity of a few enthusiasts to change this state of affairs, and a risk of final destruction for an international campaign to prevent the rival of Rome from falling definitively into oblivion, into "the abyss of history."

=== Ancient history of the site ===
Regarding the first occupants, the Libyco-Numidian population substrate, little information is available. Archaeology is silent on this matter, the only mentions available being the ancient texts of Appian (Libyca, 1, 2) and Justin (Epitome of the Philippic Histories, XVIII, 5, 8).

For over a millennium, the city of Carthage was at the forefront of history as a crossroads of civilizations due to its geographical location.

==== Phoenician and Punic Carthage ====
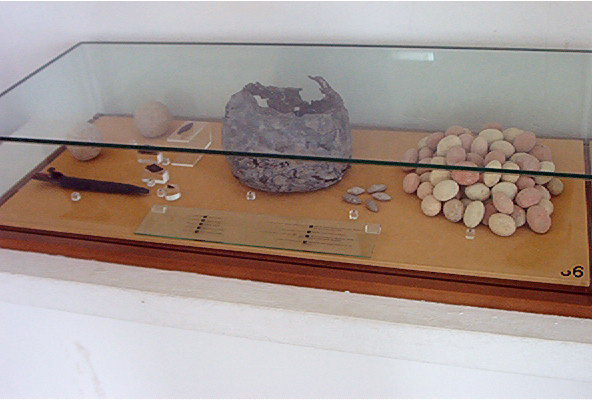
Vestiges from the siege of 149-146 BC in a display case at the National Museum of Carthage.

According to tradition, the city was founded by Dido (also known as Elissa) in 814 BC, about sixty years before its rival, Rome, which would eventually surpass it. The city quickly expanded, creating various colonies and confronting Greek colonies, particularly in Sicily. These, especially Syracuse and Agrigento, brought war to Punic lands at the beginning of the 5th century and then at the end of the 4th century. It was during the vicissitudes of this antagonism that the destruction of the Punic city of Kerkouane is placed.

The first relations with Rome were peaceful, as evidenced by treaties concluded in 509 BC, then in 348 BC and 306 BC, which guaranteed Carthage exclusivity in trade from Africa and no pillaging against Rome's allies in Italy. The episodes known as the Punic Wars saw the antagonism extend over more than a century, from 264 BC to 146 BC. A favorable outcome for the Punic city seemed possible, as evidenced by the adventure of General Hannibal Barca. The first conflict took place from 264 BC to 241 BC, resulting in Carthage losing Sicily and paying a heavy tribute.

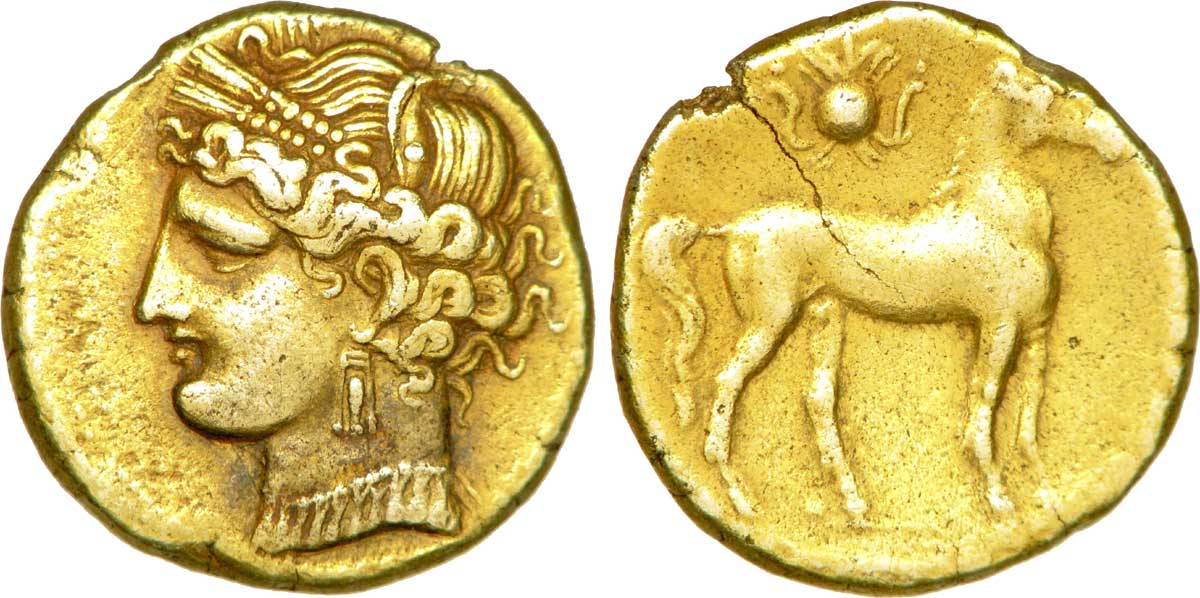
Trihemistater, tridrachm in electrum (circa 264-241 BC).

This first defeat led to serious social consequences with the episode of the Mercenary War, from 240 BC to 237 BC, with the city being saved by Hamilcar Barca. Carthage then oriented its imperialism towards the Iberian Peninsula and clashed with Rome's allies, making the second conflict inevitable (219 BC–201 BC). After 205 BC, the war took place only on African soil, with the year 202 BC marking the final victory of Scipio Africanus at Zama. The following fifty years saw Carthage regularly repay the heavy tribute but also equip itself with costly facilities like the Punic ports in their final state of development. Yet, faced with the city's recovery and the end of tribute payments, Rome demanded that the Carthaginians abandon the city and withdraw to the hinterland. On this subject, Velleius Paterculus wrote that "Rome, already mistress of the world, did not feel safe as long as the name of Carthage existed." The logical refusal that followed this intransigence led to the third conflict, which, along with the siege of Carthage, lasted three years.

At its end, even if salt was not spread on the ground as legend has it, the destruction of the city was total, and a curse was placed on its site. Remarkably, this city with its ground declared sacer, meaning cursed, was able to be reborn and become a crucial center for the diffusion of cultural, artistic, and spiritual novelties, even if it was not their original cradle.

==== Roman Carthage ====
Gaius Gracchus, tribune of the plebs in 123 BC, attempted in 122 BC to establish a colony of former veterans, a short-lived attempt – the memory of the old rival was still vivid less than a quarter of a century after its destruction – but archaeological traces remain in the Carthaginian countryside, particularly the centuriations. The desire to settle veterans resurfaced with Julius Caesar, but this project also came to nothing due to Caesar's assassination on the Ides of March in 44 BC. The rebirth of the city was the work of Augustus, who refounded it in 29 BC and renamed it Colonia Iulia Concordia Carthago: to the ancient name were added his own family – the Julii – and the concord so desired after the horrors of the civil wars that had agitated Rome in the last century BC.

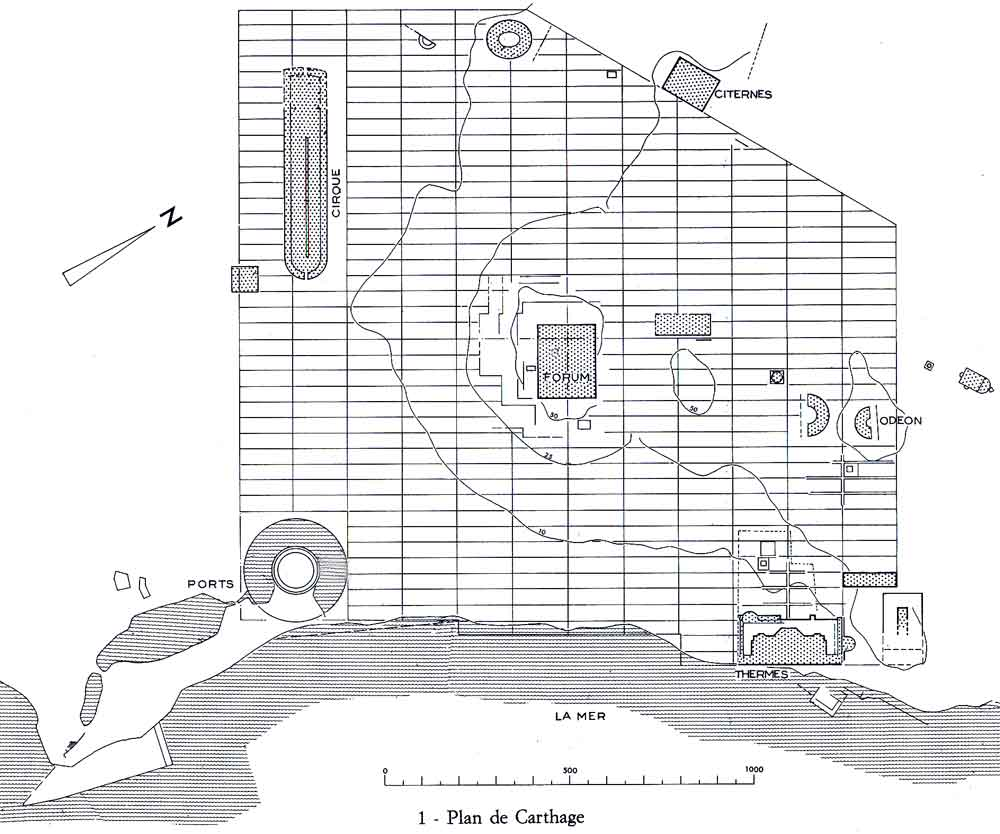
Plan of Roman Carthage.

The first constructions of the city were public; they responded to the design of making it an example of Romanity and launching the process of Romanization in this region with a Libyco-Numidian and Punic past. Private installations came only later, with the growing enrichment provided by the numerous exports to Rome: mainly wheat, but also olive oil intended particularly for the cura annonae system. From an administrative city – seat of the procurator — it became an important and prosperous city with a population estimated at 300,000 inhabitants at the time of the Vandal conquest. However, the first Roman city is poorly known due to the successive catastrophes that struck it: earthquakes, fire under the reign of Antoninus Pius.

The accession to imperial power of the Severan dynasty reflects the enrichment of the African land at the end of the 2nd century and the beginning of the 3rd century. However, the crises that shook the Roman Empire in the 3rd century had serious consequences for Carthage, notably during the usurpation of Gordian I and the repression that followed his fall in 238: the city was pillaged, including its temples. Similarly, from 308 to 311, the city became the capital of the usurper Domitius Alexander and, upon his fall, was again subjected to pillaging. With this century, Carthage nevertheless experienced renewed economic growth, expressed by the vitality of both private constructions, with multiple villas demonstrating the opulence of their owners, and public constructions, particularly the facilities for the new dominant cult.

==== Christian Carthage ====
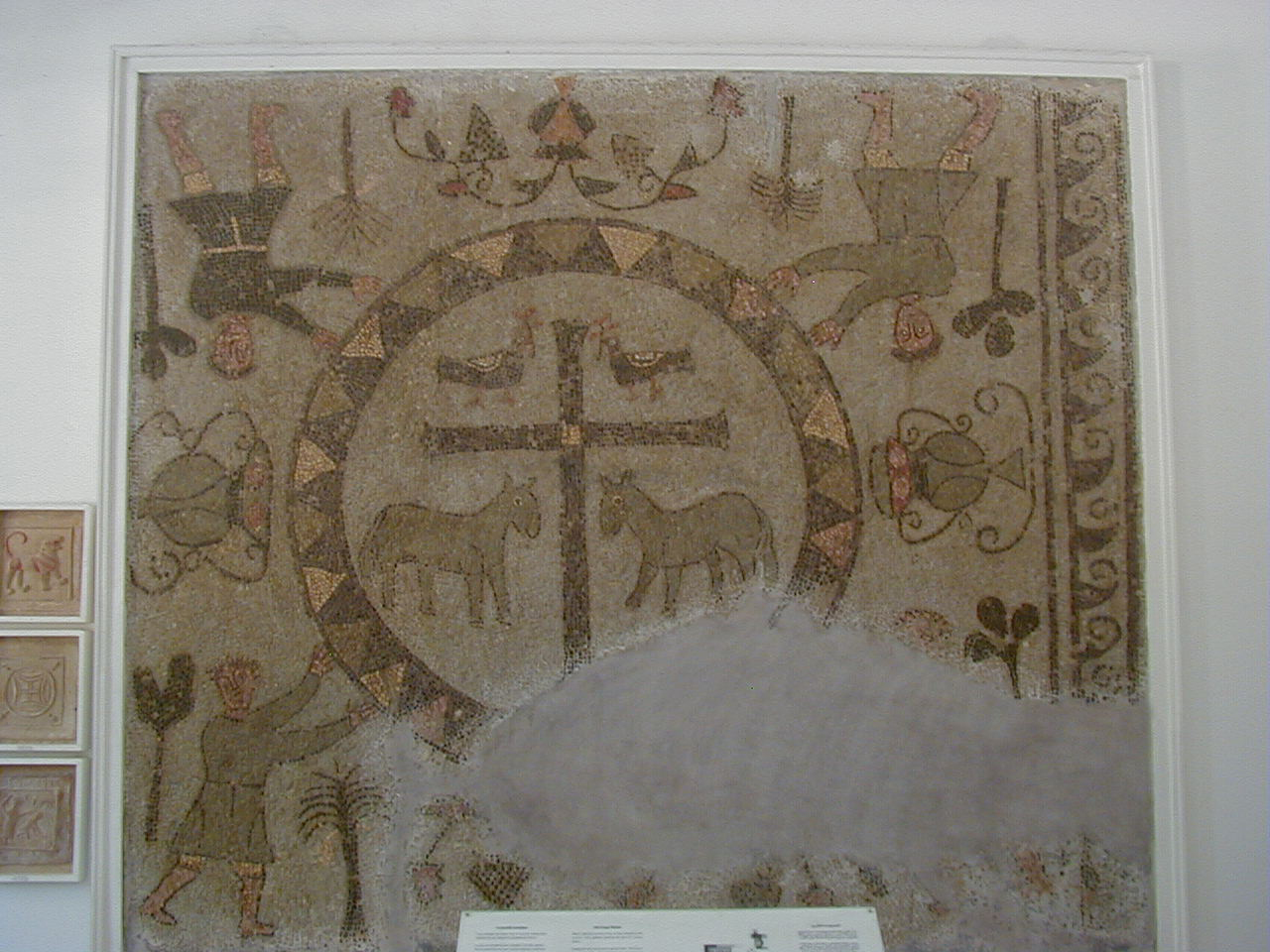
Christian mosaic of the four evangelists from the National Museum of Carthage, found in a villa of the vicus castrorum.

In an open space like Carthage was at the time – the port was notably connected to the great cities of Alexandria and Antioch, which were two major centers of evangelization — Christianity developed early, following the important Jewish communities established in the city. By the end of the 1st century, colonists, merchants, and soldiers were also agents of the propagation of Christianity, and the new religion progressed rapidly in the province, despite sporadic persecutions, with the first martyrs attested as early as 17 July, 180.

The city thus became one of the essential centers for the diffusion of the new faith, and religious confrontations with pagans were violent. Carthage and the province of Africa were quickly considered the beacon of Western Latin Christianity; Tertullian was one of the first Christian authors in Latin. Saint Cyprian, its first bishop, was martyred on 14 September, 258, at a time when the new religion was already widespread in society. This expansion was not without clashes, particularly during the Donatist schism — a consequence of rivalries among prelates eager to occupy the seat of the primate of Africa – which was definitively condemned at the Conference of Carthage opened on 1 June, 411, organized by the party of its most ardent contradictor, Bishop Augustine of Hippo.

Augustine accused the schismatics of having severed the ties between the African Catholic Church and the original Eastern Churches. Despite this religious struggle, the economic, social, and cultural context was relatively favorable at the time of Christianity's triumph. It was accompanied by a religious organization of the city in the 4th century: a division into six districts was made, and basilicas marked each of them. The second city of the West after Rome, Carthage had at the beginning of the 5th century a population of over 300,000 inhabitants, and its area exceeded 321 hectares.

The city was conquered by the Vandal troops of Genseric in 439. In addition to the destructions carried out by the newcomers, attested among others by an author like Victor of Vita, they attempted to impose Arianism in place of Catholicism: persecution was then legitimized, and the approximately 500 clergy of Carthage were expelled. This Vandal period coincided with a new era of persecutions. Then the Vandal Kingdom eventually collapsed, and the Byzantine emperor Justinian I became the new master in 533. The Byzantine period experienced various vicissitudes, including the subjugation of the members of the Church of Africa, while the page turned on ancient history with the Arabo-Muslim conquest of 698, which saw Carthage pass into the background of history.

=== Decline and rediscovery ===
==== Decline in historiography ====
Before its capture in 698, the capital of the province of Africa had emptied of its Byzantine inhabitants. The decline was evident shortly after Justinian's reconquest, with Abdelmajid Ennabli mentioning a city "neglected by the central power preoccupied with its own survival, gradually abandoned by a population whose aristocracy emigrated." By the early 7th century, archaeology testifies, according to Liliane Ennabli, to a "shrunken city, retracted on its center." The conqueror Hassan ibn al-Nu'man had the port facilities destroyed to prevent any return of the Byzantines, dealing a final blow to the city. The materials were massively reused: "for centuries, [it] was nothing more than a marble quarry," as M'hamed Hassine Fantar wrote. This recovery was for the benefit of buildings in present-day Tunisia — the forest of columns in the Zitouna Mosque comes from there — but also of important buildings in the Mediterranean basin, such as the Cathedral of Pisa. The recovery of the "spoils of the great corpse lying on the shores of the gulf" was not only of the noblest materials, columns, and capitals: a large number of lime kilns were found on the site, particularly during the clearance of the Baths of Antoninus, contradicting Al-Bakri, who claimed that "the marble is so important in Carthage that if all the inhabitants of Ifriqiya gathered to extract the blocks and transport them elsewhere, they could not accomplish their task." Al Idrissi, an eyewitness to this frenzied predation, declared: "These excavations do not cease, the marbles are transported far away to all countries, and no one leaves Carthage without loading considerable quantities on ships or otherwise."

==== Scientific research ====
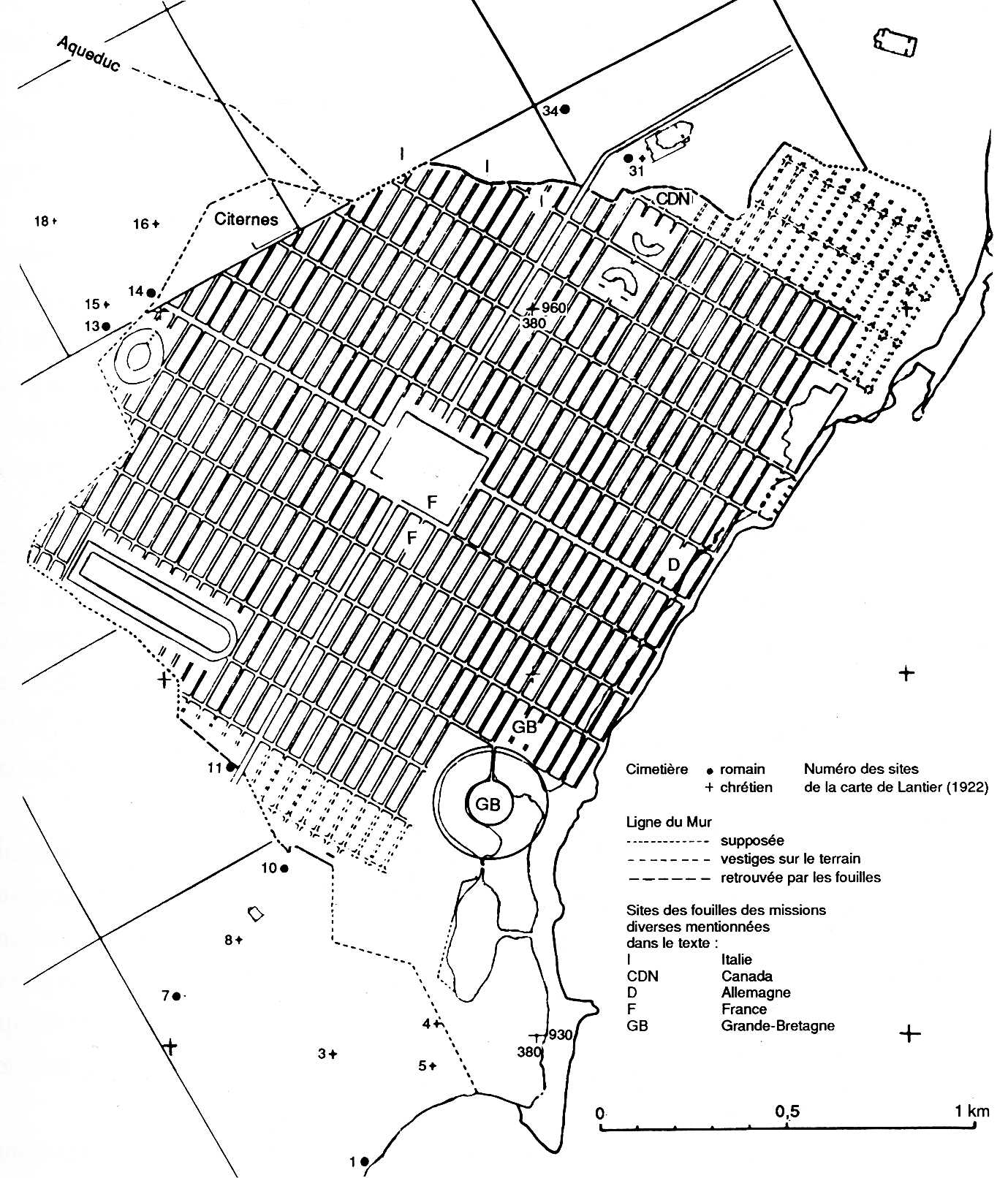
Plan of the Roman city with locations of UNESCO campaign interventions.

The early 19th century was that of pioneers, both travelers and visionaries. Christian Tuxen Falbe, consul of Denmark, drew the first topography of the remains in his Recherches sur l'emplacement de Carthage published in 1833. A historical and archaeological society was born in Paris and aroused interest, even a "fashion of irresistible attraction" that found a certain culmination with the publication of Salammbô by Gustave Flaubert in 1858. Charles Ernest Beulé, for his part, highlighted during a trip the Roman apses on the hill of Byrsa but quickly faced the difficulties of excavations on this space, which had been reworked many times, not without predicting that "Carthage will have its turn, like Egypt, like Nineveh, and like Babylon." The role played by the White Fathers also deserves to be recalled. Thus, Father Delattre was sent there from 1875 by Cardinal Lavigerie with not only an apostolic but also an archaeological purpose. He was particularly interested in Punic necropolises as well as Christian basilicas. During the first years of the French protectorate, the Bey of Tunis signed several decrees, one concerning the creation of the National Museum of Bardo, and the other regulating excavations and protecting the heritage.

Carthage then saw a handful of enthusiasts, often amateur archaeologists, working tirelessly to bring the site out of oblivion. Even if some excavation methods may seem questionable today, Serge Lancel noted that they "multiplied remarks and observations still usable at a time when official archaeology was confined to necropolises or disinterested in Carthage." Thanks to these enthusiasts, working at a time when heritage protection was still vague, essential elements were safeguarded, sometimes at the cost of their own money.

Such is the case of the discovery of the tophet in 1921 by Paul Gielly and François Icard under rocambolesque circumstances. We must also mention Dr. Louis Carton, who uncovered the "fountain of a thousand amphorae," even if the excavations were not always devoid of personal interests, as the recovery of objects was common at the time. As for Charles Saumagne, thanks to his observations of the terrain, he drew the plan of the Roman city as early as 1924, a plan that remains largely valid even after the latest excavation campaigns. The last of these pioneers is Pierre Cintas, a customs administration official who undertook university studies to devote himself to the subject and authored a Manuel d'archéologie punique (1970–1976). This work, left unfinished at the time of his death, remains a primary synthesis tool on the first excavations.

From May 1972, the teams of the UNESCO international mission worked under the coordination of the site curator Abdelmajid Ennabli.

Distribution of the UNESCO international mission teams
Nationality	Activities	Personalities
Germany	Punic then Roman residential quarter (near the shore) discovery of a Punic temple called of Apollo	Friedrich Rakob
Bulgaria	rotunda of Damous El Karita	Stefan Boyadjiev
Canada	circular monument, Theodosian wall, and suburban villas	Pierre Senay, Colin M. Wells, Vanda Vitali, Jeremy Rossiter
Denmark	Punic residential quarter at the foot of the Amilcar cliff	Soren Dietz
United States	Tophet of Salammbô, commercial port, and circus	Lawrence E. Stager, John H. Humphrey, Naomi Norman
France	hill of Byrsa villa of the cryptoporticus	Serge Lancel, Jean-Paul Thuillier, Jean-Paul Morel, Pierre Gros, Jean Deneauve Jean-Pierre Darmon
Italy	cadastration	Andrea Carandini, Giuseppe Pucci
United Kingdom	military port and enhancement of the Admiralty islet	Henry Hurst
Sweden	Roman villa	Carl-Gustaf Styrenius
Tunisia	anastylosis of the frigidarium column and restoration of the Baths of Antoninus enhancement of the villa of the aviary	Liliane Ennabli, Fethi Chelbi

== Private spaces ==
Even though many Roman villas have been excavated for a long time, few remains have been highlighted on the site, except in the park called "Roman villas." The decorative elements, mainly mosaics, removed, the wall sections were often abandoned, and the site was left to pillaging. For this reason, and somewhat paradoxically, it is easier to stroll through a late Punic residential quarter, protected by the Roman embankment of the hill of Byrsa for two millennia. Another earlier Punic quarter, called "Magon quarter," was excavated by the sea.

Ruins of residential quarters

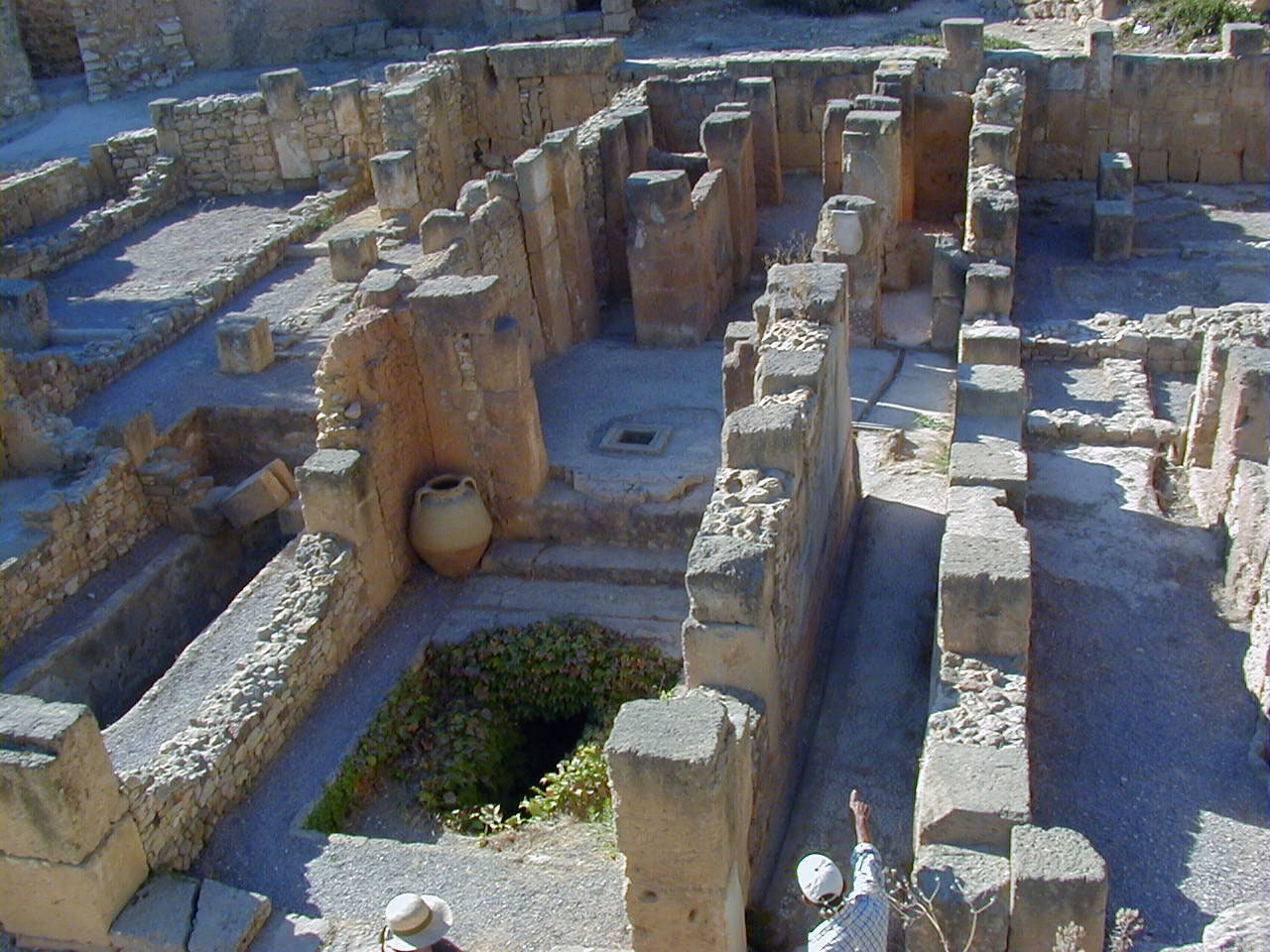
Punic house of Byrsa.

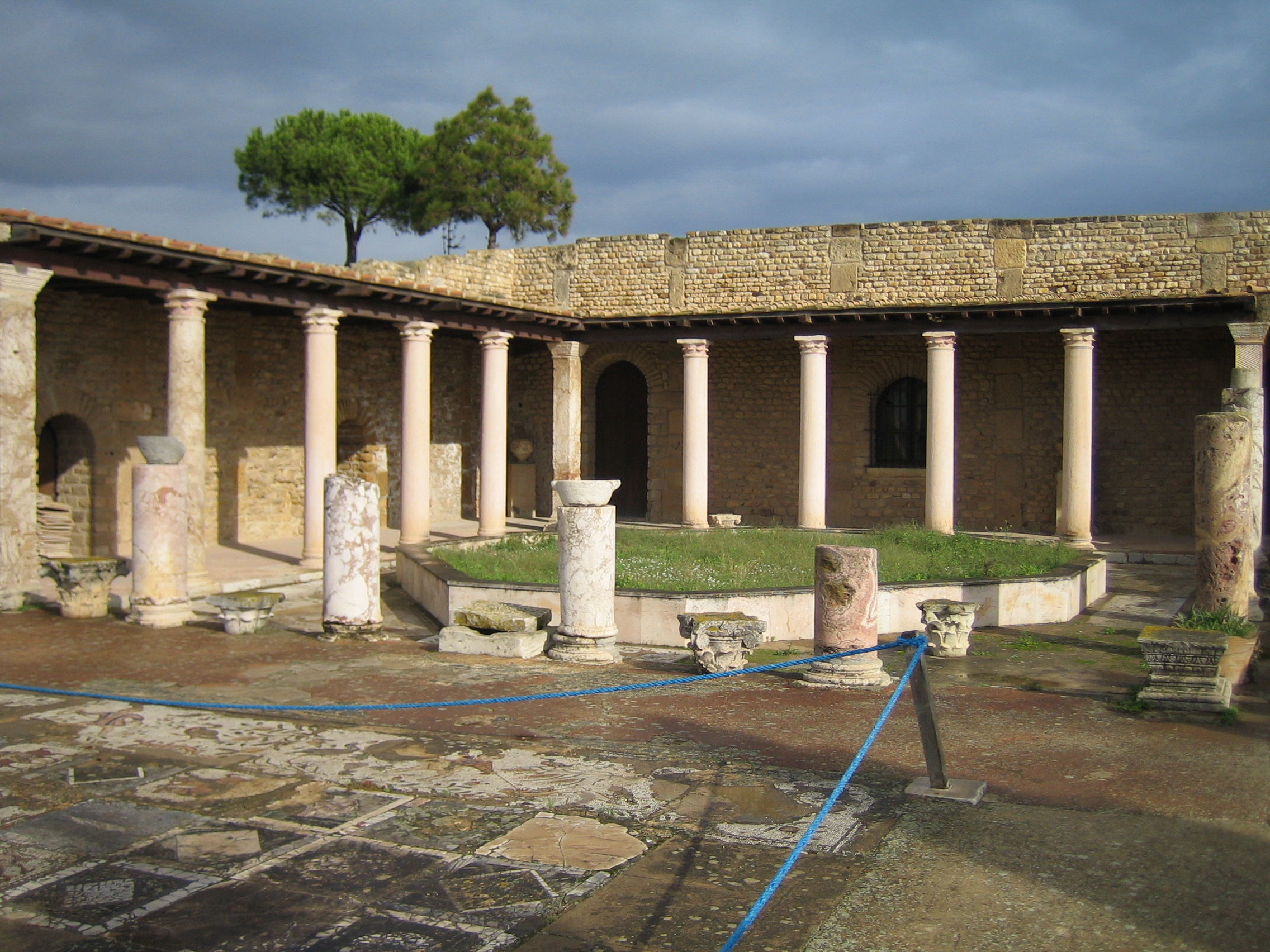
Villa of the aviary.

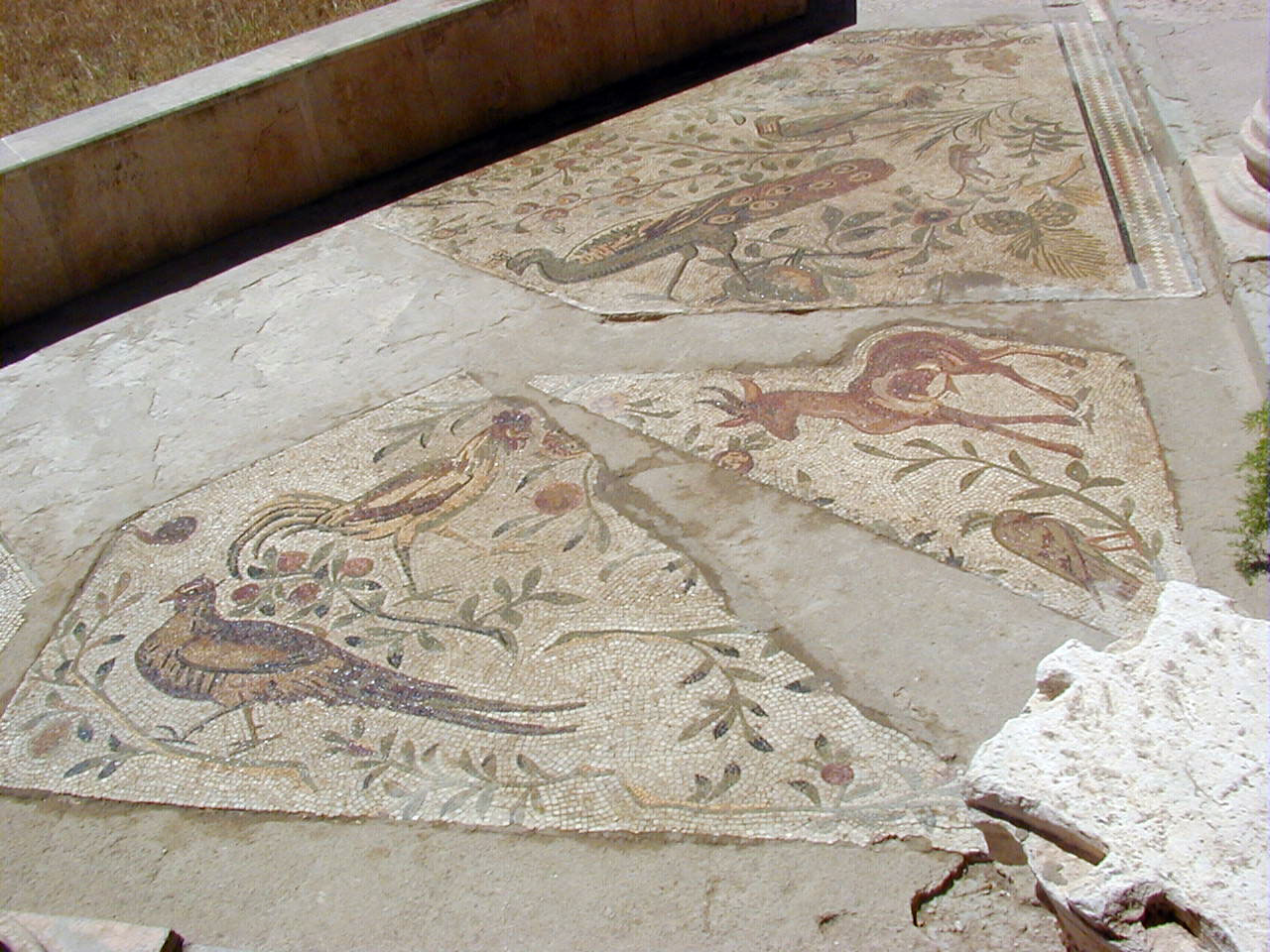
Mosaic of the aviary.

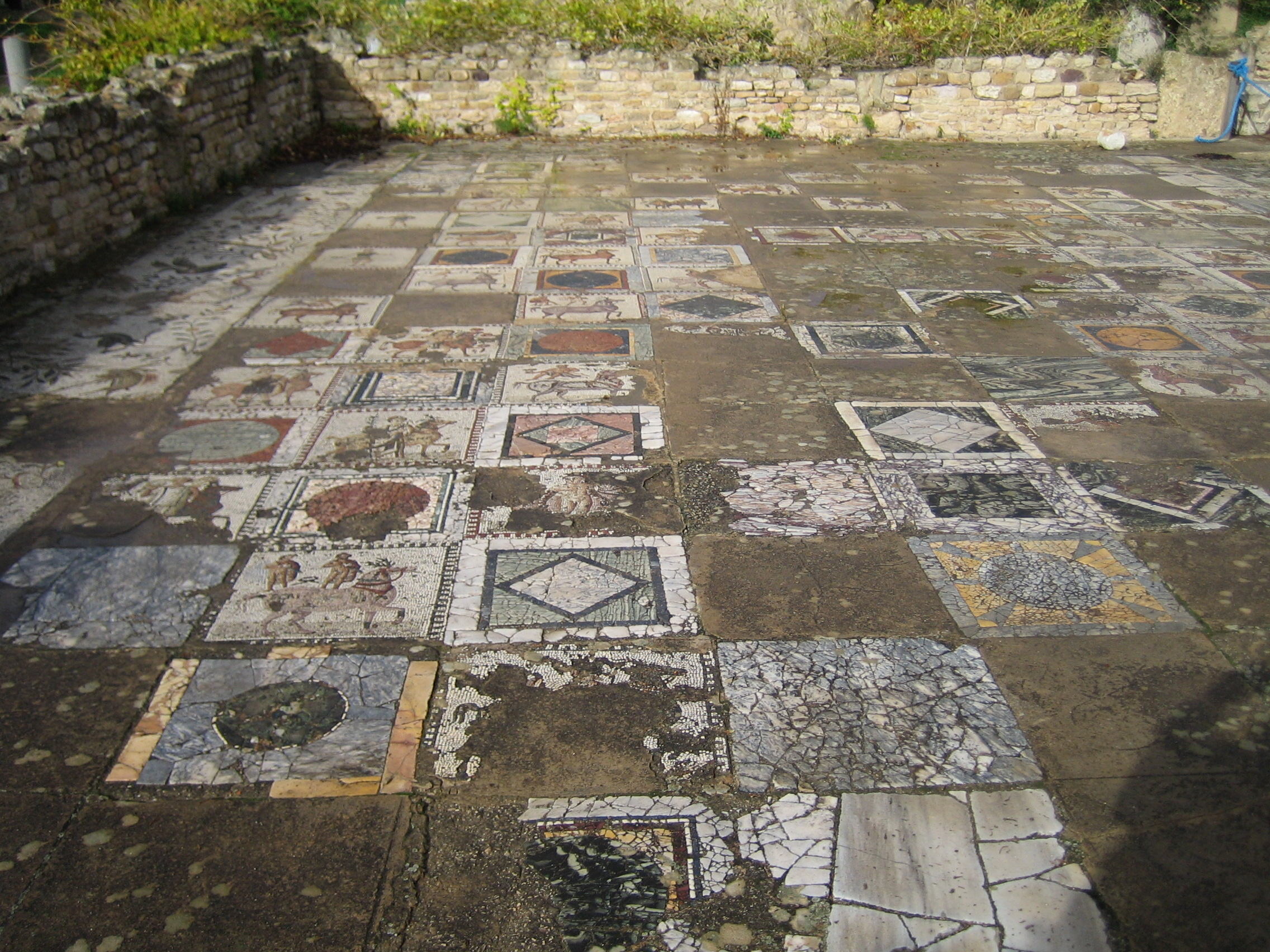
Mosaic of the horses.

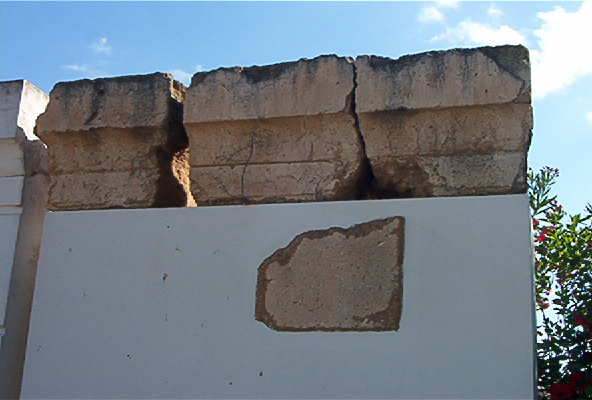
Upper elements of the Punic wall surrounding the Magon quarter.

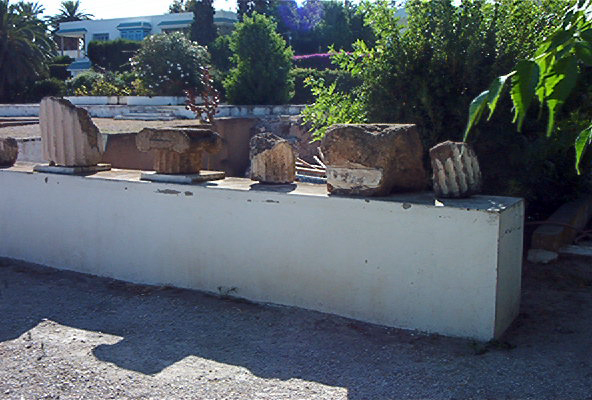
Punic lapidary elements (column fragments).

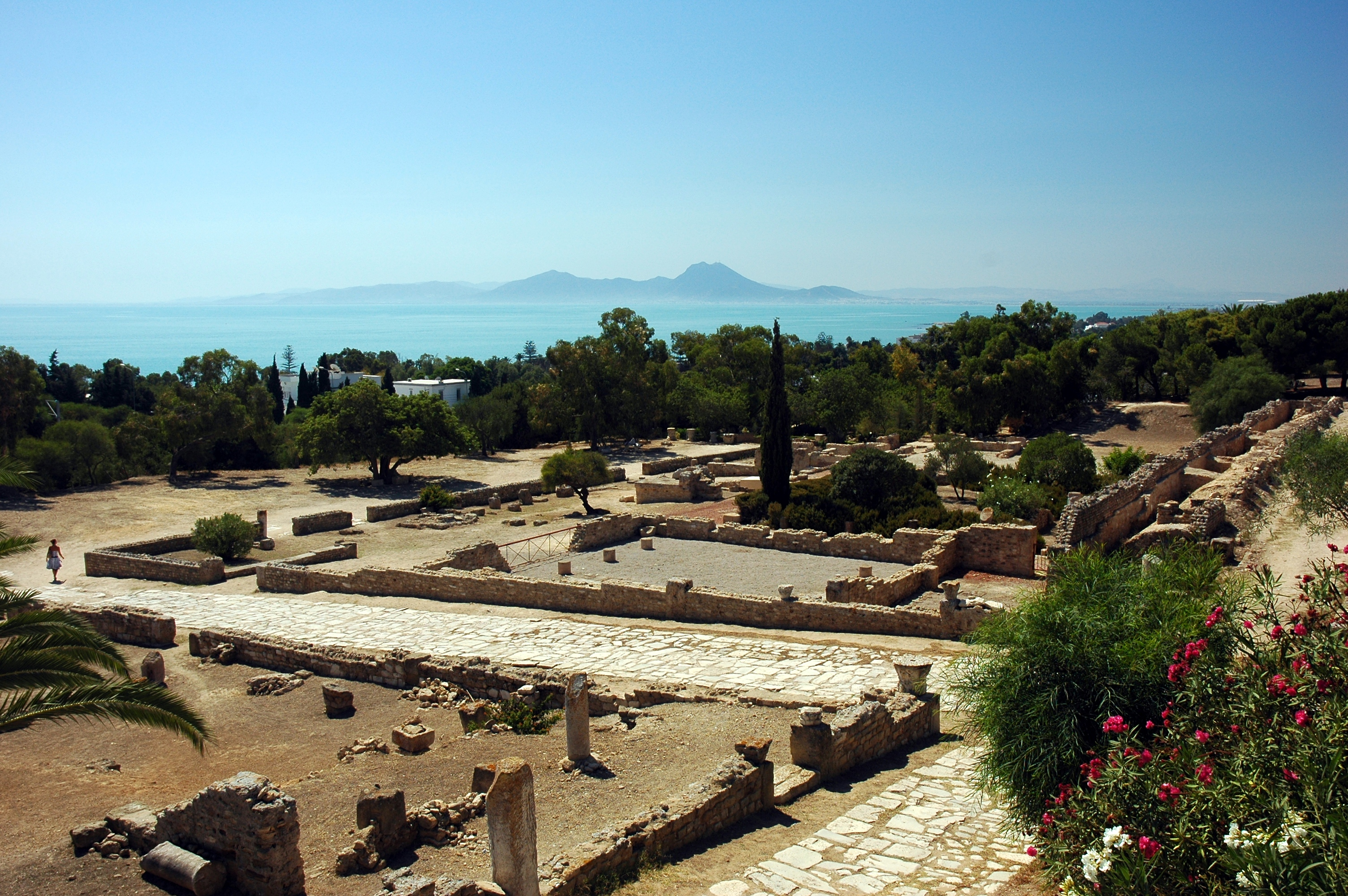
Quarter of the Roman villas with the villa at the cryptoporticus on the right.

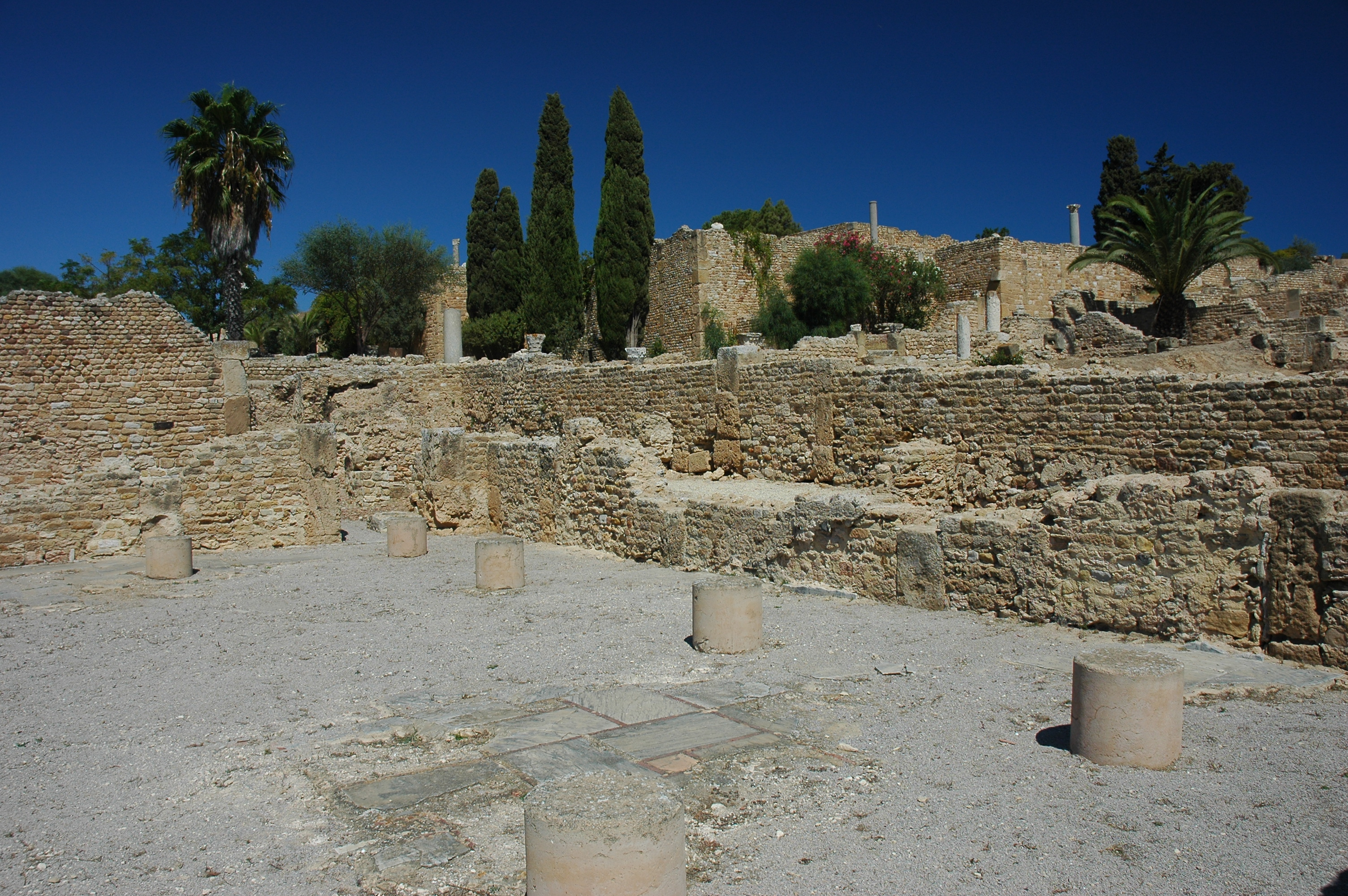
Overview of part of the quarter called Roman villas.

=== Byrsa ===
On the summit of the hill of Byrsa, the location of the Roman Forum, a Punic residential quarter from the last century of the city's existence was uncovered, dated more precisely to the early 2nd century BC. It was excavated by the French archaeologist Serge Lancel. Visiting this site is interesting for those who cannot go to Kerkouane (a Punic city on Cape Bon). Indeed, the organization of the quarter and the dwellings between shops and private spaces is particularly significant.

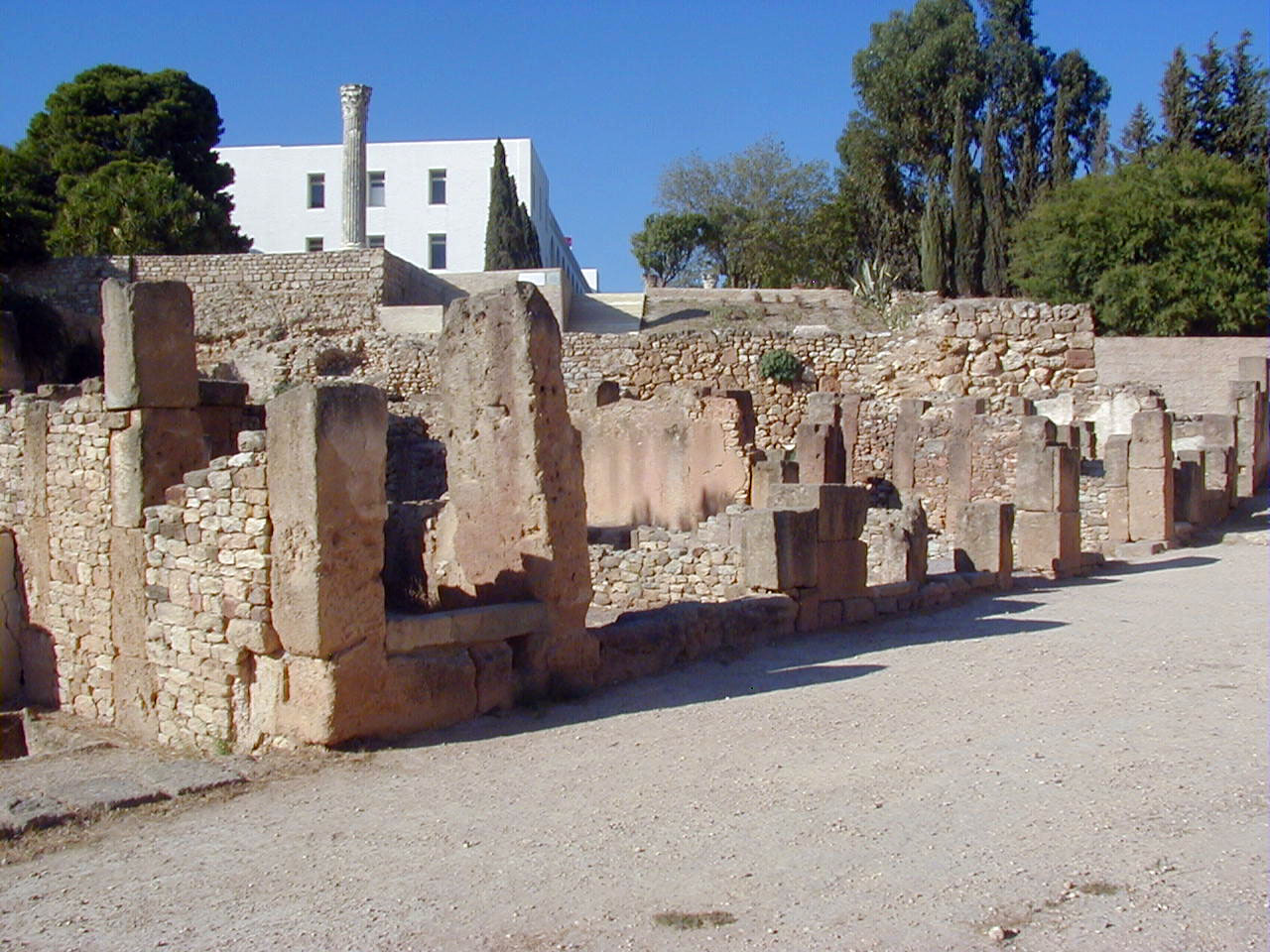
Punic quarter of Byrsa.

The habitat is typical and even stereotyped, with a room on the street that could be used as a shop, a cistern installed in the basement to collect water for domestic use, and a long corridor on the right side leading to a courtyard with a cesspool, around which small rooms are arranged in varying numbers. Some floors are covered with mosaics called pavimenta punica, sometimes in the middle of a characteristic red mortar.

The remains were preserved thanks to the Roman embankments, the substructure of the forum whose foundation piles dot the quarter. The different housing blocks are separated by orthogonal streets, approximately six meters wide, with beaten earth roadways. One can also see in situ stairs intended to compensate for the slope of the hill. This building program, which required organization and political will, inspired the name of the quarter, baptized "Hannibal quarter" in reference to the suffetate of the great general at the beginning of the 2nd century BC.

=== Magon ===
Not far from the sea, an area of the Punic city was excavated by German archaeologists. They discovered a section of the rampart that protected the city in the 5th century BC as well as an entire residential quarter whose evolution during the two centuries preceding the destruction of 146 BC they were able to decipher. Even if the site is open to tourists, it remains difficult to interpret for non-specialists. Nevertheless, the fragments of Punic columns and several upper elements of the seafront wall are moving, albeit tenuous, testimonies. One can see a villa with a peristyle.

Archaeologists have determined an urban organization scheme from the oldest developments of which traces have been preserved, with streets about three meters wide and a notable exception: a vast street nine meters wide heading towards a "sea gate" opened in the rampart.

In a small antiquarium, restitutions of the site at various periods of the Punic city are exhibited, as well as a maquette of a stone extraction well located in El Haouaria.

=== Roman villas and Kobba Bent el Rey ===
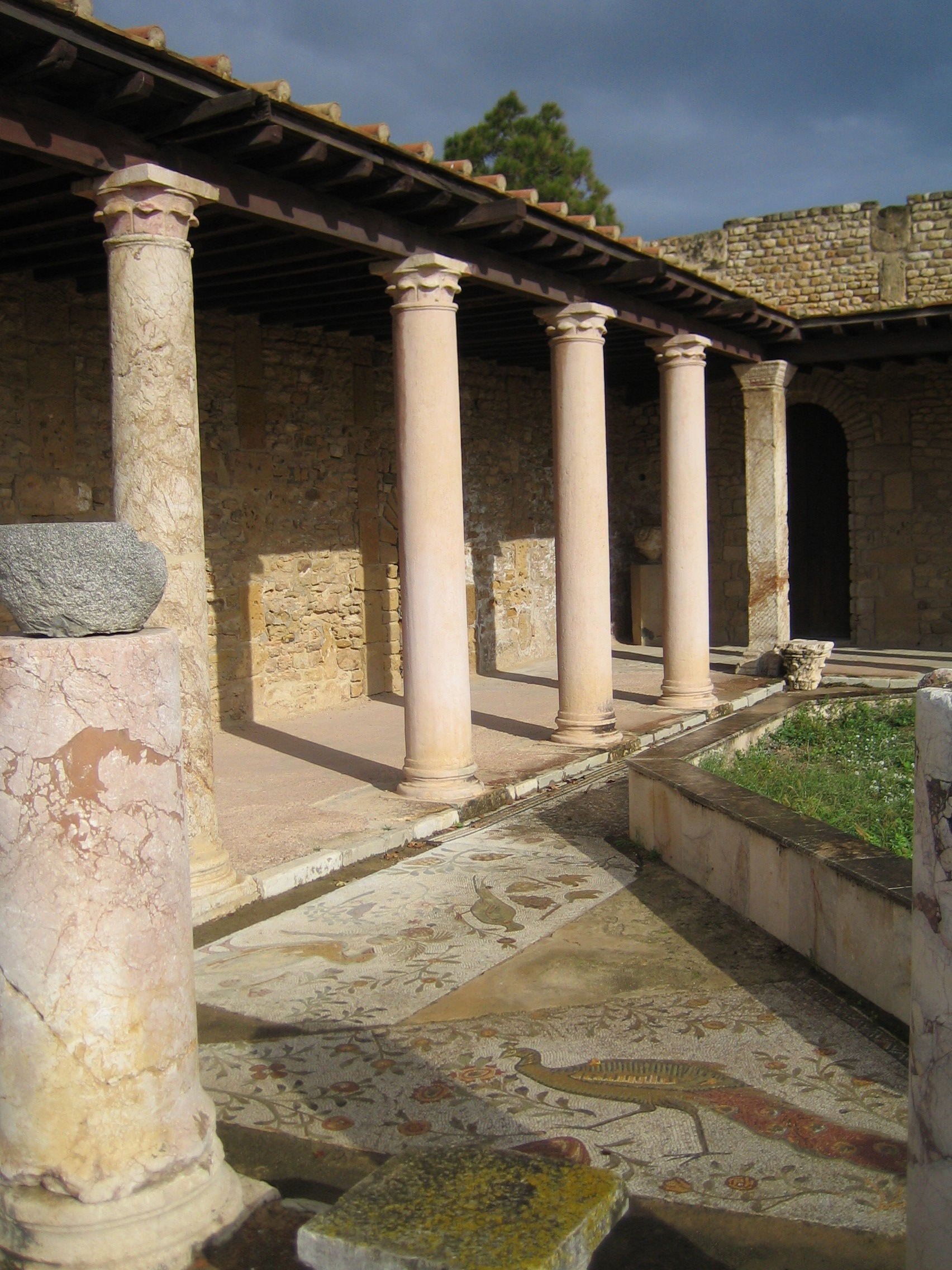
Atrium of the villa of the aviary.

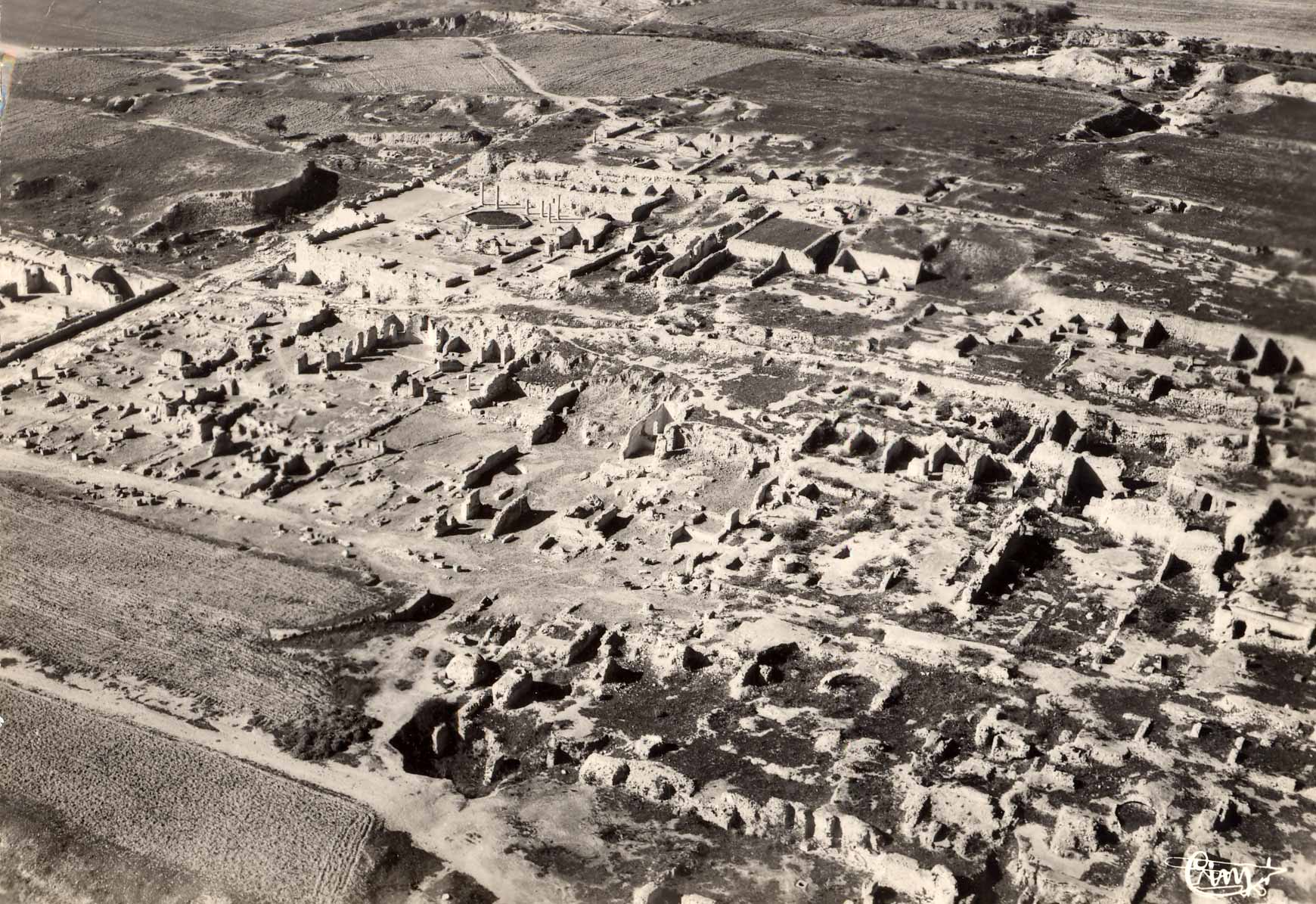
Aerial view of the Roman villas site in 1950.

Near the theater, an area constituting today the park called "Roman villas" was uncovered. It houses, in addition to the famous "villa of the aviary," named after the main mosaic that decorates it, many significant remains related to the topography of the place. The slope is quite steep there, and interesting elements of several villas have been cleared, including a cryptoporticus that housed some of the objects now visible in the epigraphic collections of the National Museum of Bardo.

The "mosaic of the aviary" is located in the villa of the same name, around a colonnaded courtyard, and depicts birds among foliage. This building, dated to the 4th century, has undergone careful restoration. Both by its plan, which gives pride of place to reception rooms, and by its decor, particularly mosaics, the wealth of the owner is evident in what remains one of the most telling examples on the site of Carthage.

The "mosaic of the horses," located not far from this villa, is a mixture of mosaics and panels of marble from various origins where squares of marble in opus sectile alternate with mosaics of horses whose names are suggested by a kind of rebus.

Towards the back of the park are the remains of the Basilica of Damous El Karita as well as those of a circular monument whose purpose remains mysterious. On the hill of Bordj Djedid, within the precincts of the Carthage high school, persists a beautiful vaulted underground construction currently called Kobba Bent el Rey; it is dated to the years 320–340. This building, despite uncertainty about its original purpose, is considered the best-preserved residential element on the site of Carthage.

== Necropolises ==
The necropolises of the ancient city are quite difficult to recognize on the current site, with the only relatively significant remains discovered and still visible being a number of Punic tombs, particularly in the park of the Antonine Baths and on the southern flank of the hill of Byrsa. The rediscovery of the city and the Punic civilization has long been dependent on the excavation of necropolises alone.

Overview of tombs from various necropolises

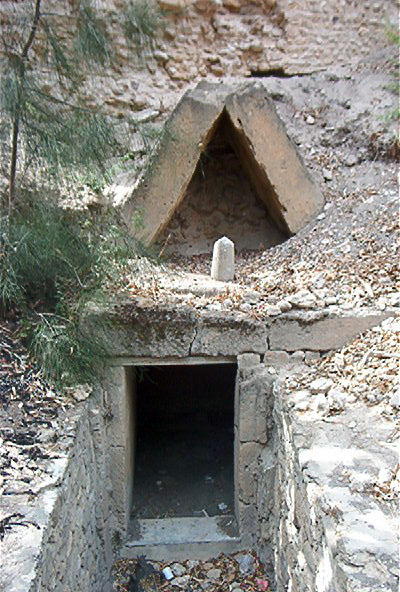
Punic tomb in the Antonine Baths park.

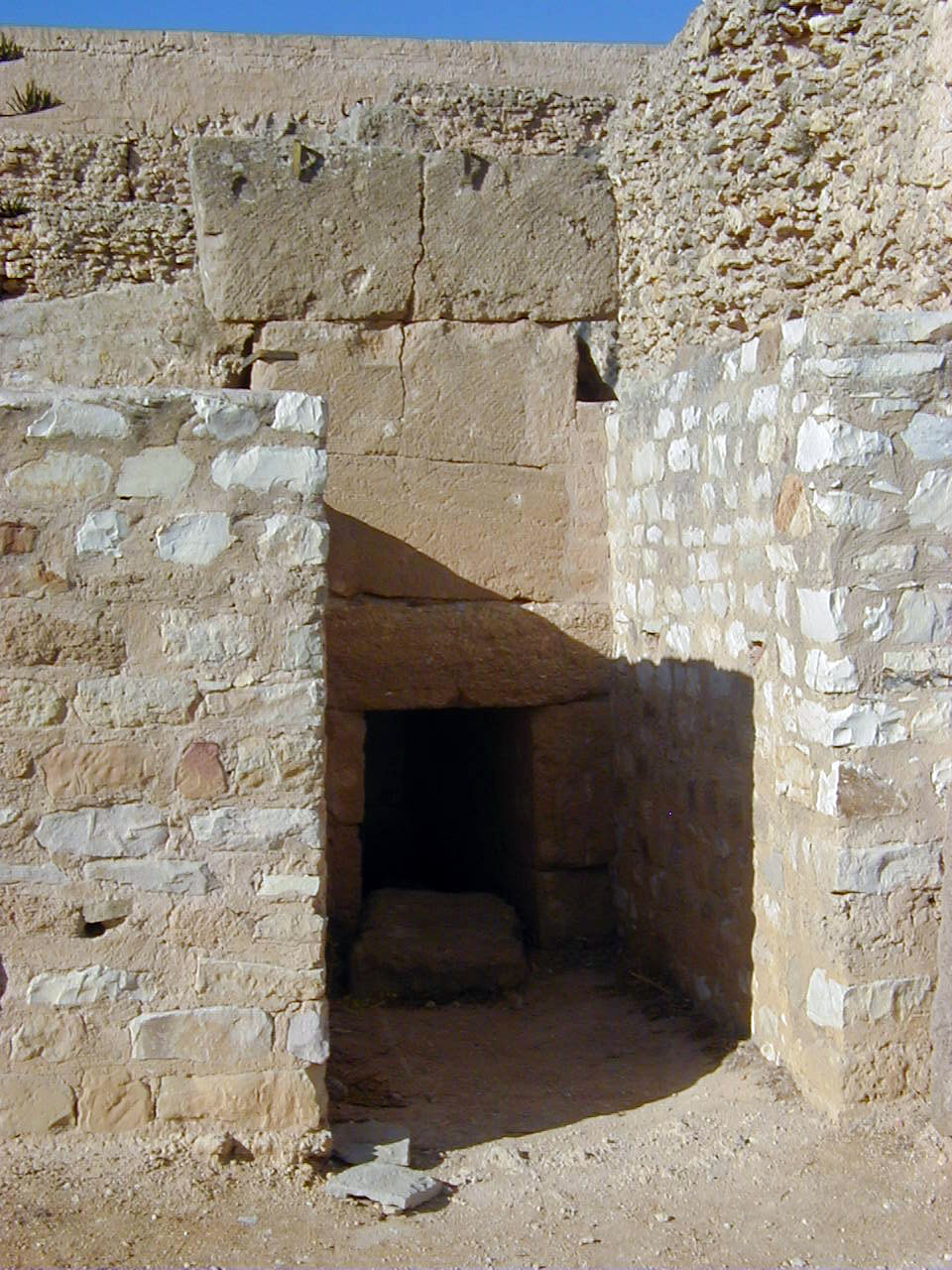
Punic tomb on the southern flank of Byrsa.

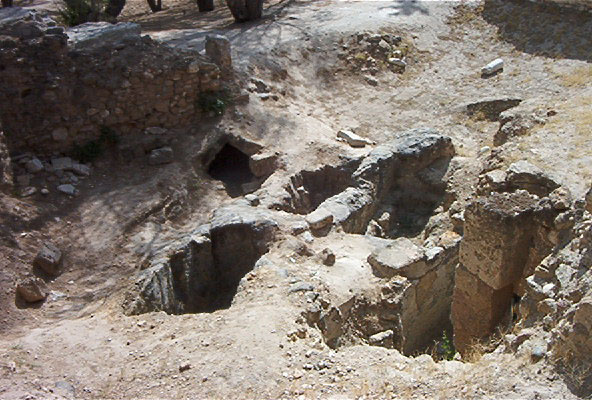
Punic tombs in the Antonine Baths park.

=== Funeral rites, inhumation, and incineration in Carthage ===
The rite of inhumation dominates in Carthage in the early period, in relation to "a significant mixture of the population with the indigenous Libyans," according to Serge Lancel, even though incineration exists in some necropolises of the Punic city. Cremation is a sign of fidelity to an ancient tradition from Phoenicia and takes place elsewhere than at the burial site. No ustrinum is known. Incinerated deceased are placed in amphorae, and those inhumed in pits or wells are either in coffins or directly in the ground. Inhumed deceased are laid on their backs, following "the Eastern tradition." The Libyan populations, on the other hand, place their deceased in a "lateral decubitus flexed" position.

Incineration dominates in Carthage from the 5th century BC, either for a spiritual reason or due to lack of space, according to Serge Lancel, with the old necropolises being disused to make way for urban growth; however, "inhumation in large funeral chambers persists." The furnishings in the tombs also evolve, between tombs with provisions and others with little to accompany the deceased, in relation to two beliefs about the afterlife, according to Hélène Bénichou-Safar. The remains of incinerated persons are deposited in ossuaries. The coexistence of rites noted in Carthage is also observed at the archaeological site of Motya. During their funerals, the deceased are wrapped in a shroud and placed on a bench or in a coffin or troughs. They may also be buried in ceremonial clothing, with fibulae.

The bodies were perhaps washed beforehand, with a resinous preparation poured over the body and deposited as a "conservative practice." This practice, observed in the necropolis of the Rabs, is dated to the end of the 4th – beginning of the 3rd century BC.

The bodies are placed in the tomb using ropes passing through the funeral shaft. A funeral ceremony may have taken place with rituals related to Demeter, the goddess of fertility and immortality, to the Dionysian cult, or other cults for the dead. Incense or perfumes may have been burned, and a small animal may have been sacrificed. Hélène Bénichou-Safar notes that nothing can prove the existence of funeral banquets or processions of mourners, even though for the latter tradition, late testimonies exist. A cult may have been rendered to the dead, and the necropolises were then perceived as a "sacred area (...) inviolable, like divine sanctuaries."

The interiors of the burials have accessories, niches, and benches of very varied shapes. Some tombs contain up to eight deceased and are "a family vault." After the ceremony, the pits could be filled with white sand or red sand from present-day Sidi Bou Saïd, or have a system of sealing slabs. 10 to 15% of the inhumed deceased were buried in a stone sarcophagus, either directly or in a wooden structure like a coffin.

=== Necropolises of Carthage and their organization ===
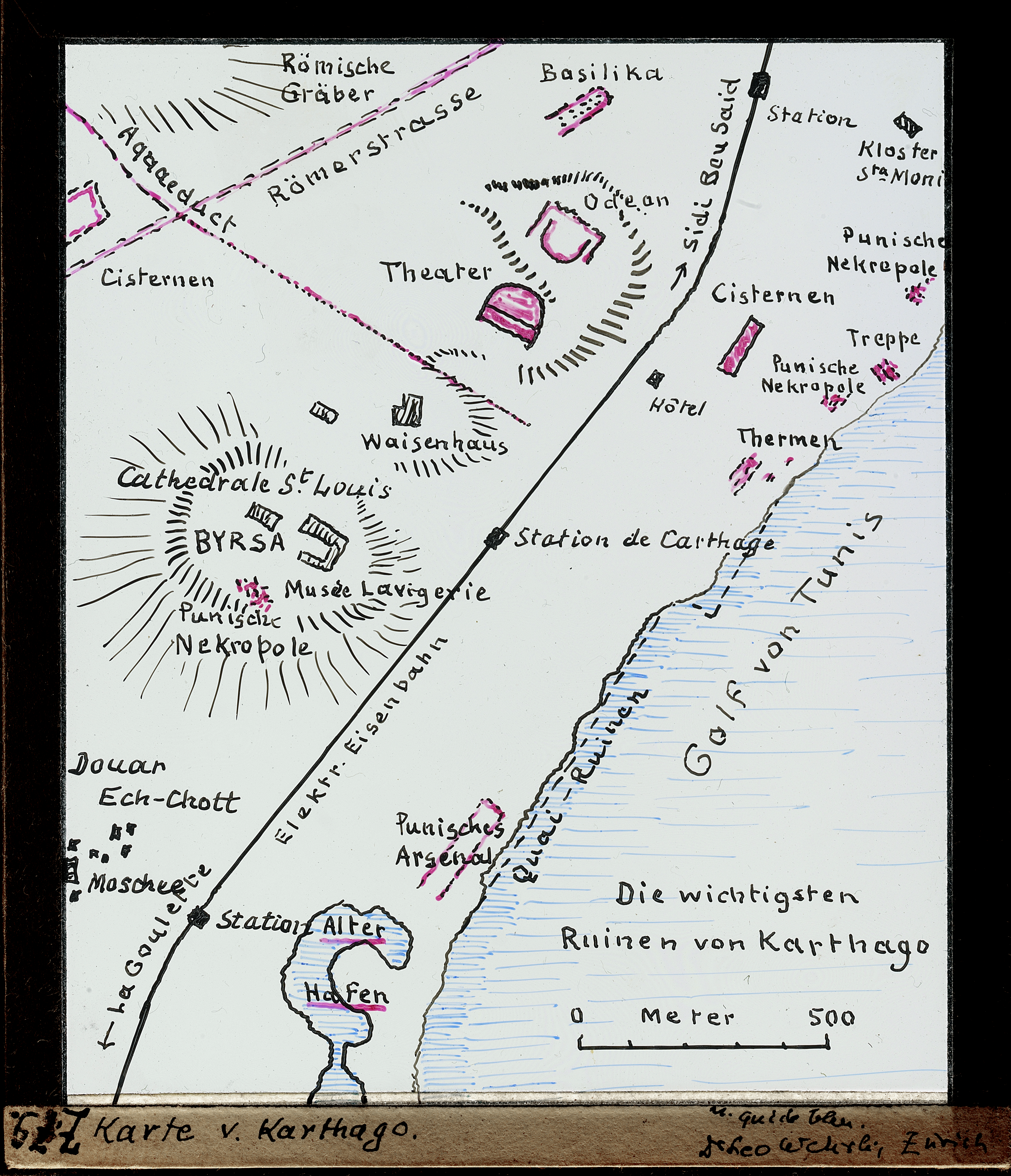
Old map of Carthage dated from the mid-20th century.

The necropolises of Carthage could cover about 60 hectares, and Salah-Eddine Tlatli gives the Punic city an area greater than 300 hectares. Hélène Bénichou-Safar, in her book published in 1982 and taking into account works up to 1977, lists more than 3,000 tombs excavated over a century on the archaeological site of Carthage. M'hamed Hassine Fantar thinks this number can go up to 3,500. The excavators of the necropolis of the Rabs explored about 1,000 vaults on this site alone, which were aligned.

The first necropolises of Carthage are located on the hills of Byrsa, Juno, Dermech, and Douimès from the 8th to the 5th century BC. From the 4th century BC, necropolises occupy the hills of the theater, the odeon, and Sainte-Monique, but also areas closer to the sea, like at Ard el-Khéraïb.

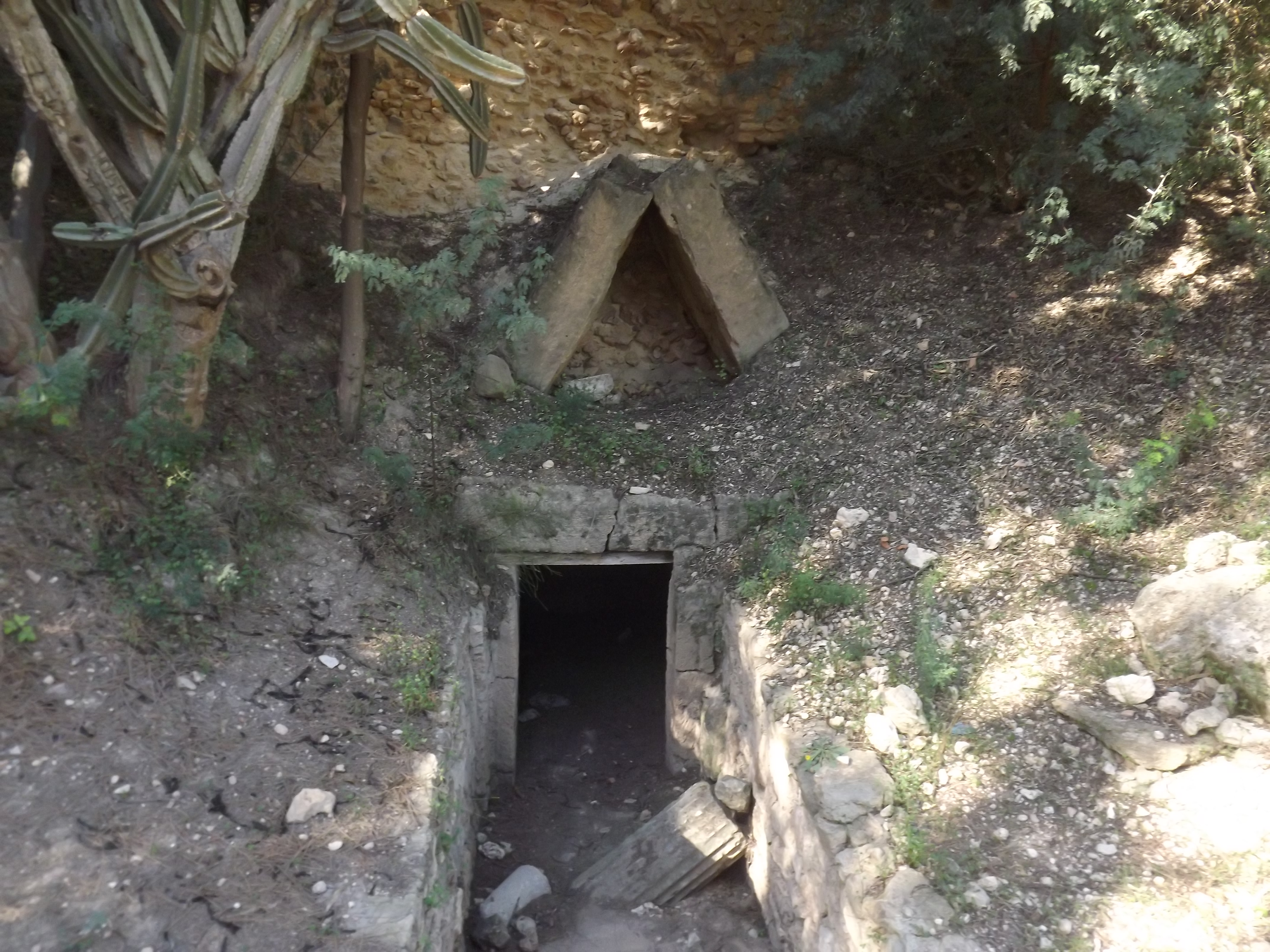
Access to a dromos tomb in the Baths of Antoninus park (illustrative image).

Access to the chambers is either through pits or through dromos-type accesses. The ceiling of the richest tombs may have a wooden paneling, as in the tomb of Yada'milk, made of various wood species from the forests of Kroumirie or Cyrenaica but with rot-resistant properties.

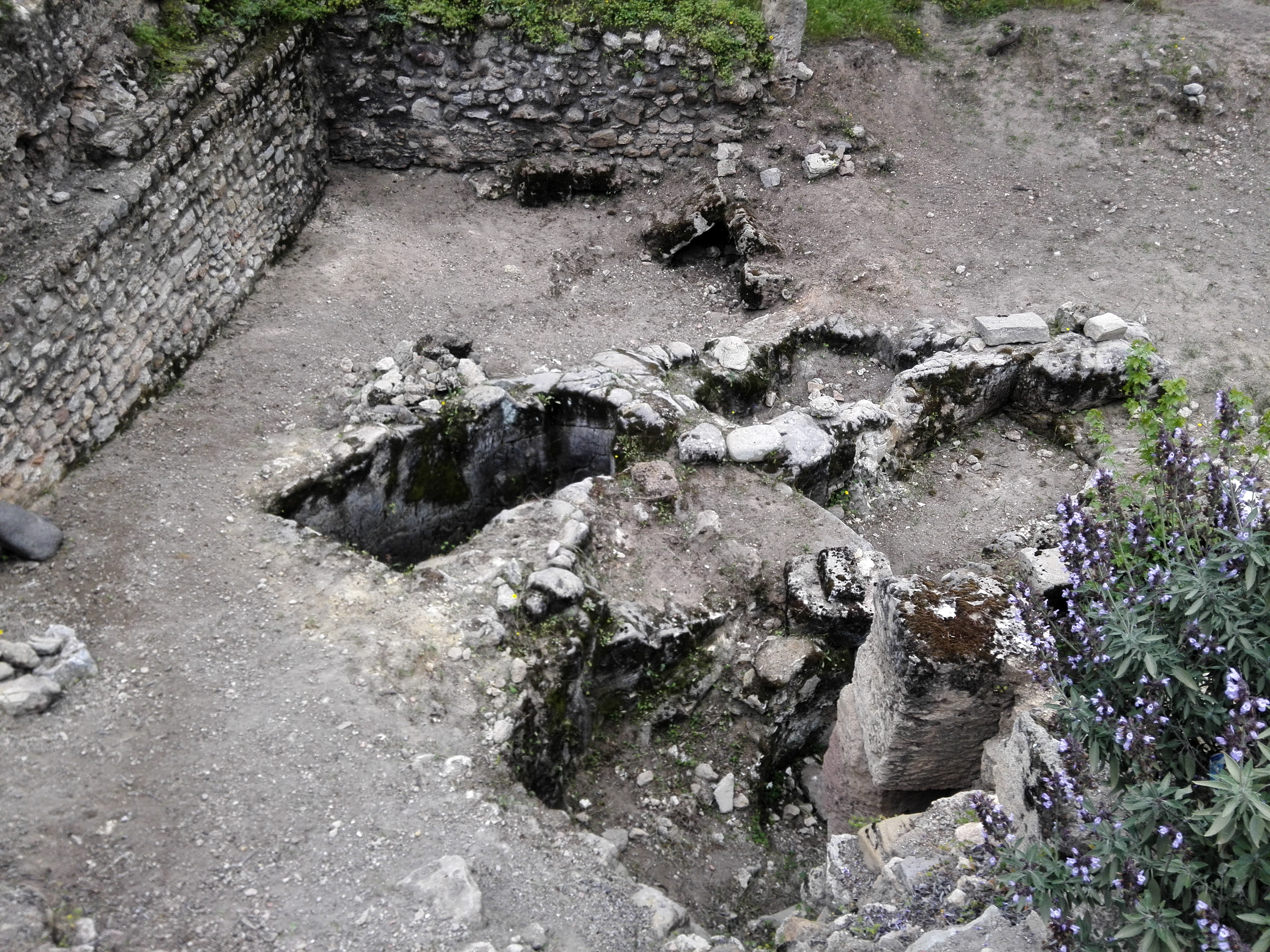
Groups of pit tombs in the Baths of Antoninus archaeological park (illustrative image).

From the 6th century BC, pit tombs appear in Carthage, with varying depths. According to Abdelmajid Ennabli, the necropolis of the Rabs is occupied from the 5th to the 2nd century BC but especially in the 4th–3rd centuries BC. One-third of the tombs date from the 4th century, and two-thirds from the 3rd century. According to Salah-Eddine Tlatli, the necropolis of the hill of Sainte-Monique is dated to the 3rd century BC. The pits are on average 12 meters deep in this necropolis but can be much deeper, up to 27 meters. Notches made in the pit allow people wishing to go up or down to place their feet. The depth of the pits is a matter of security against thieves but also of prestige, or even obeys religious motives.

The access bay to the funeral chambers, measuring 1.32 m by 0.63 m, may have a console carved into the rock. The tombs were dug with more or less care. The floor can be made of rock, beaten earth, or sand. The walls of the funeral chambers are carefully cut, coated with stucco sometimes with marble powder.

The necropolises evolve over time, with areas reserved "for religious colleges, families, or clans." Tombs thus pass from an individual character to a collective one. The pits can therefore gradually have several funeral chambers, intended, for example, for couples. These chambers measure 2.20 m by 2.80 m with a height of 1.90 m.

The location of the burial is marked by a stone or a cippus, with or without inscriptions intended to "perpetuate the memory of the deceased." The "external monuments" had disappeared during the excavations. There may have been monumental buildings in the necropolis, mausoleums like those of Dougga, Sabratha, or the Medracen, among other examples that have survived; indeed, architectural elements were found during excavations at the site of Ard el-Khéraïb or Byrsa. Alfred Louis Delattre described a building covering several funeral pits. The city may have had quarries nearby during antiquity; stones could be transported from the Cape Bon quarries across the Gulf of Tunis and then cut on site.

Anthropomorphic stelae used from the 4th century BC have also been found, depicting a person in a prayerful attitude. The tombs are dug taking into account the nature of the rock. Some walls are decorated with stucco coatings, and Alfred Louis Delattre noted a cornice at the entrance of a chamber or even inside the chambers.

Funeral inscriptions have been found especially in the "aristocratic quarter of the City of the Dead." These epitaphs are sometimes engraved on slabs embedded at the entrance of the tombs and intended to close them, on stone tablets embedded in the shape of a "rectangular parallelepiped," which are "remarkable specimens of Punic calligraphy."

=== Punic necropolises ===
The Punic tombs that have been identified, numbering over 3,500, are relatively scattered throughout the city and form a kind of arc in the middle of which the habitat was located:

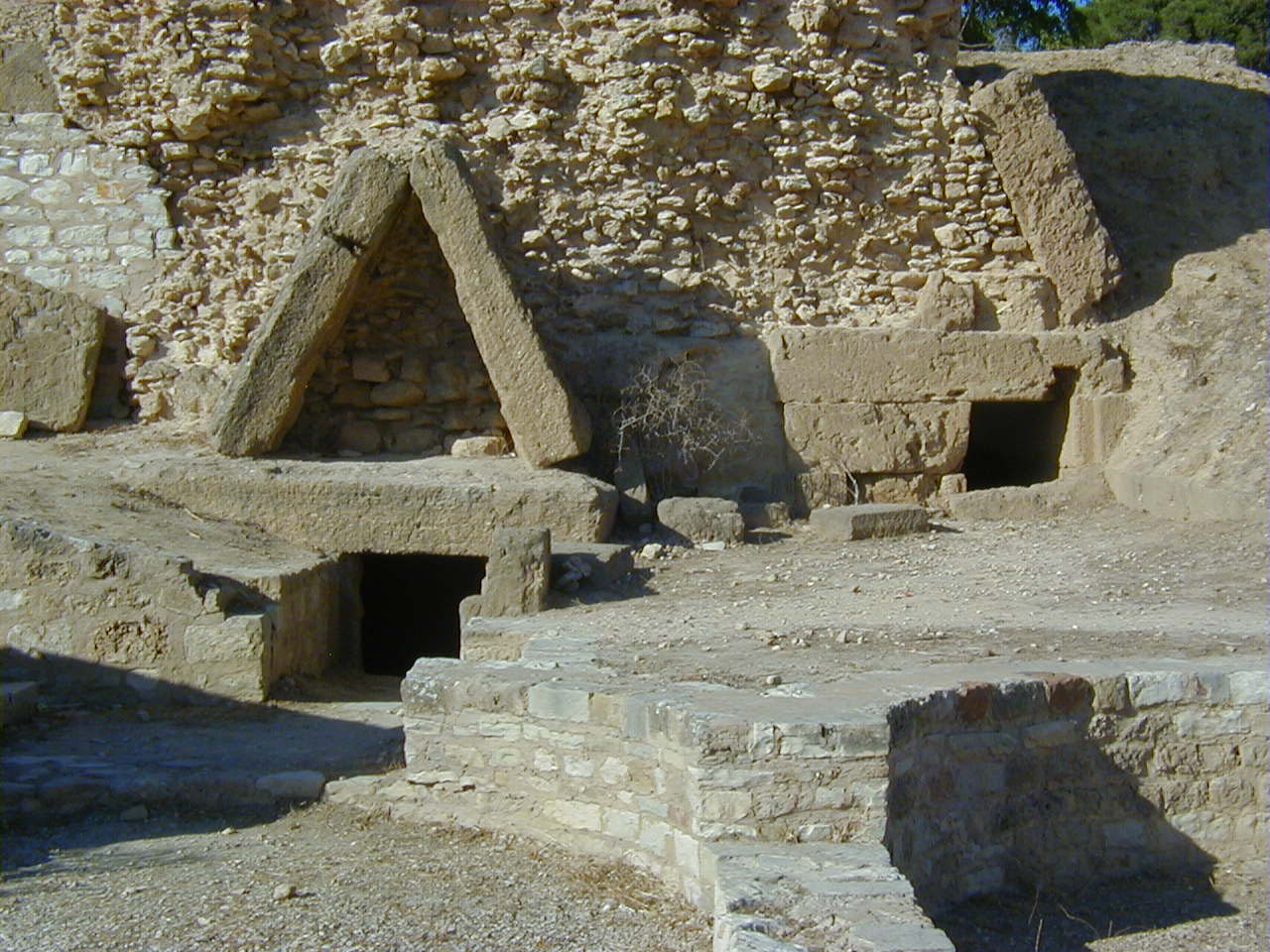
Punic tomb on the southern flank of Byrsa.

- southern flank of the hill of Byrsa;
- northern area of the current park of the Baths of Antoninus, with tombs dating before the 6th century BC;
- space occupied by the current park of Roman villas, the area of the odeon, and the hill of Juno;
- hill of Bordj Djedid and Sainte-Monique with the necropolis called "of the Rabs" (from which the two sarcophagi of the priest and the priestess come), used from the 5th–4th centuries BC until the destruction of the Punic city.

Their excavations, which gave rise to worldly ceremonies at the end of the 19th century, yielded significant material: ceramics, masks, and various small objects revealing Egyptian influences, with Hellenic influence becoming increasingly marked from the 5th–4th centuries BC. A large part of the excavations concerns mainly burials from the 7th century BC. The ancient burials were reused in the 5th century before new spaces were consecrated to the dead, according to the same arc scheme, the places being located intra muros.

Two types of burials must be distinguished, one located at the bottom of sometimes deep pits of about thirty meters and containing various funeral chambers, the other consisting of buildings of the "tomb with dromos" type. A special place must be made for the tophet, which has the particularity of being both a cemetery and a sanctuary.

=== Roman and Byzantine necropolises ===
Unlike Punic necropolises, those from the Roman period were located outside the city limits. Accessible and easily transportable, the elevated elements were most often destroyed or reused. As a result, few funeral elements remain visible today.

Recent excavations have highlighted several cemeteries, including that of the officiales, reserved for officials of the proconsular administration near the cisterns of La Malga.

Mausoleums with bas-relief stuccoed were formerly uncovered in the same sector and deposited at the National Museum of Bardo.

== Public buildings ==
From the powerful public constructions of the Punic period mentioned in the texts we have (citadel of Byrsa and agora near the ports), no trace has survived the centuries. The existing remains mainly concern the Roman period, particularly the most important monuments of "African Rome," remains that, despite their presence, are little indicative of the past greatness of the city.

Ruins of some public buildings

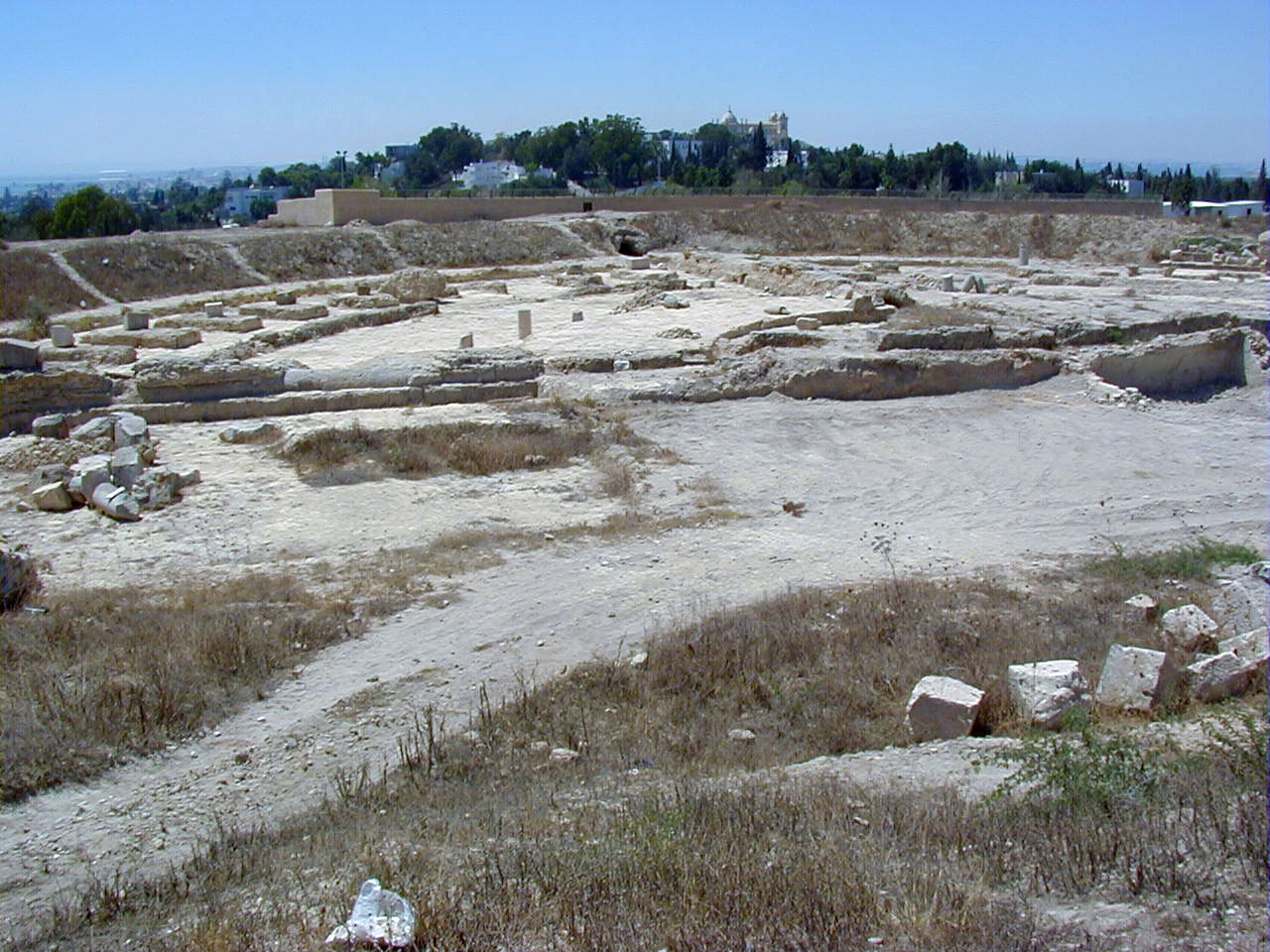
Ruins of the odeon.

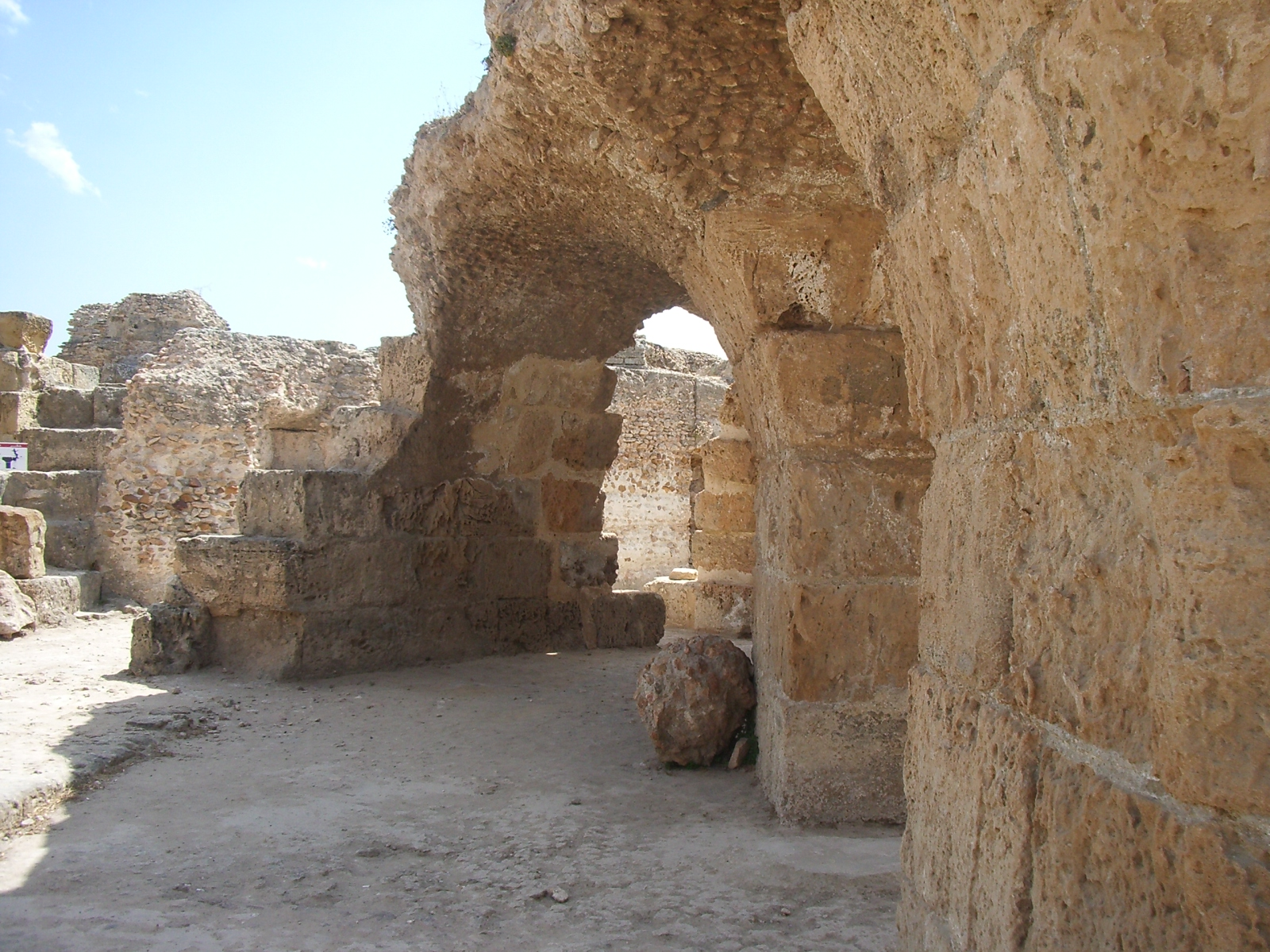
Part of the foundations of the Antonine Baths.

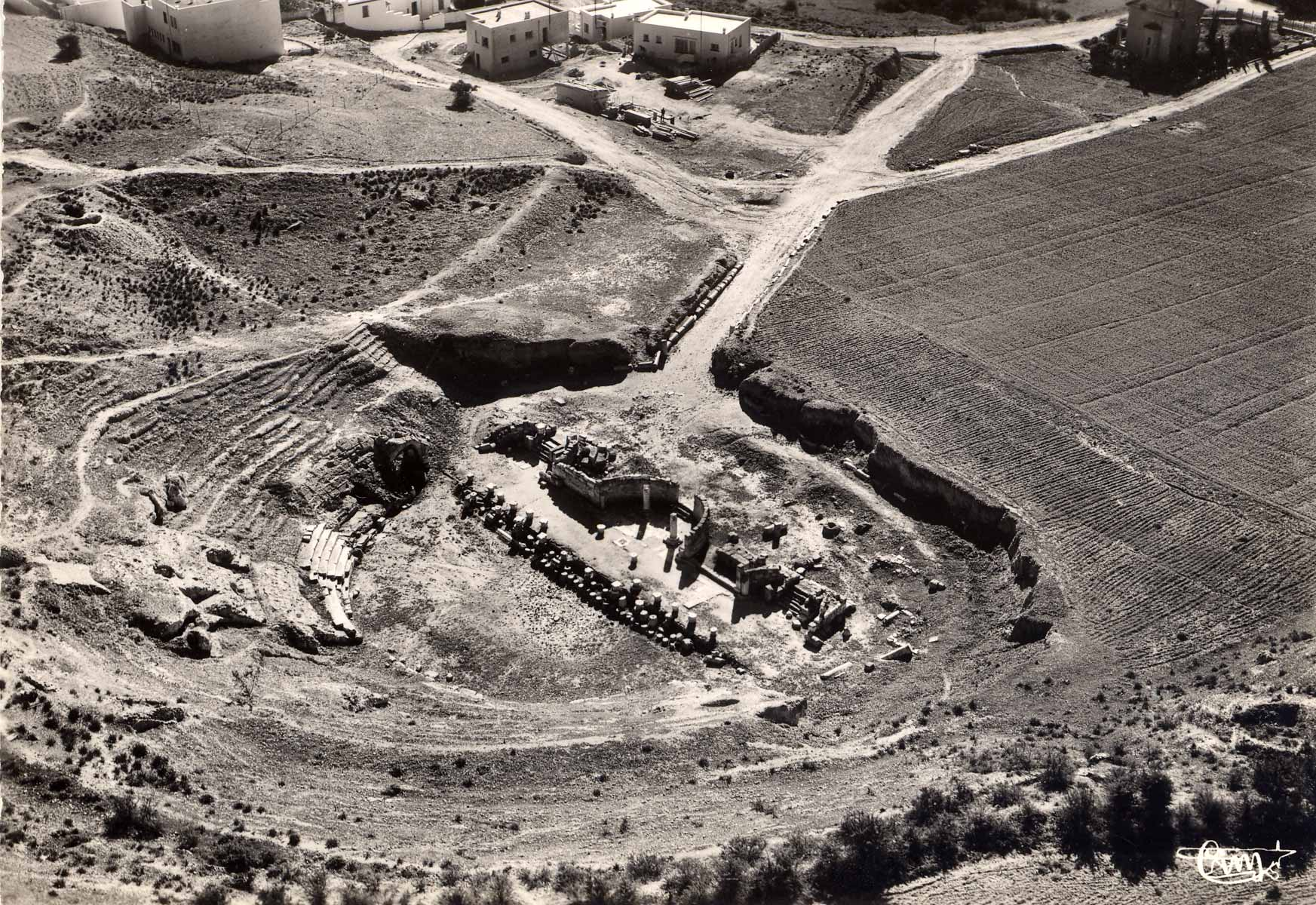
Aerial view of the theater in 1950.

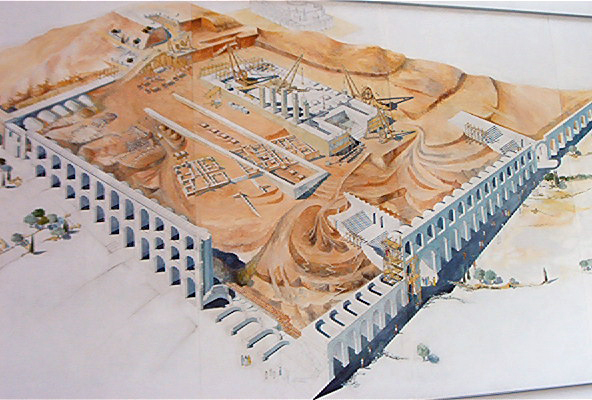
Roman terracing of the Byrsa hill.

=== Byrsa in Roman times ===
The hill of Byrsa saw extensive urbanization works from the beginning of the Roman colony, with the groma of the new African Rome located at the summit. The large platform was occupied by the elements of the forum, capitol, and civil and judicial basilicas built from the birth of the Roman colony. A curia and a tabularium completed the monumental adornment of the hill.

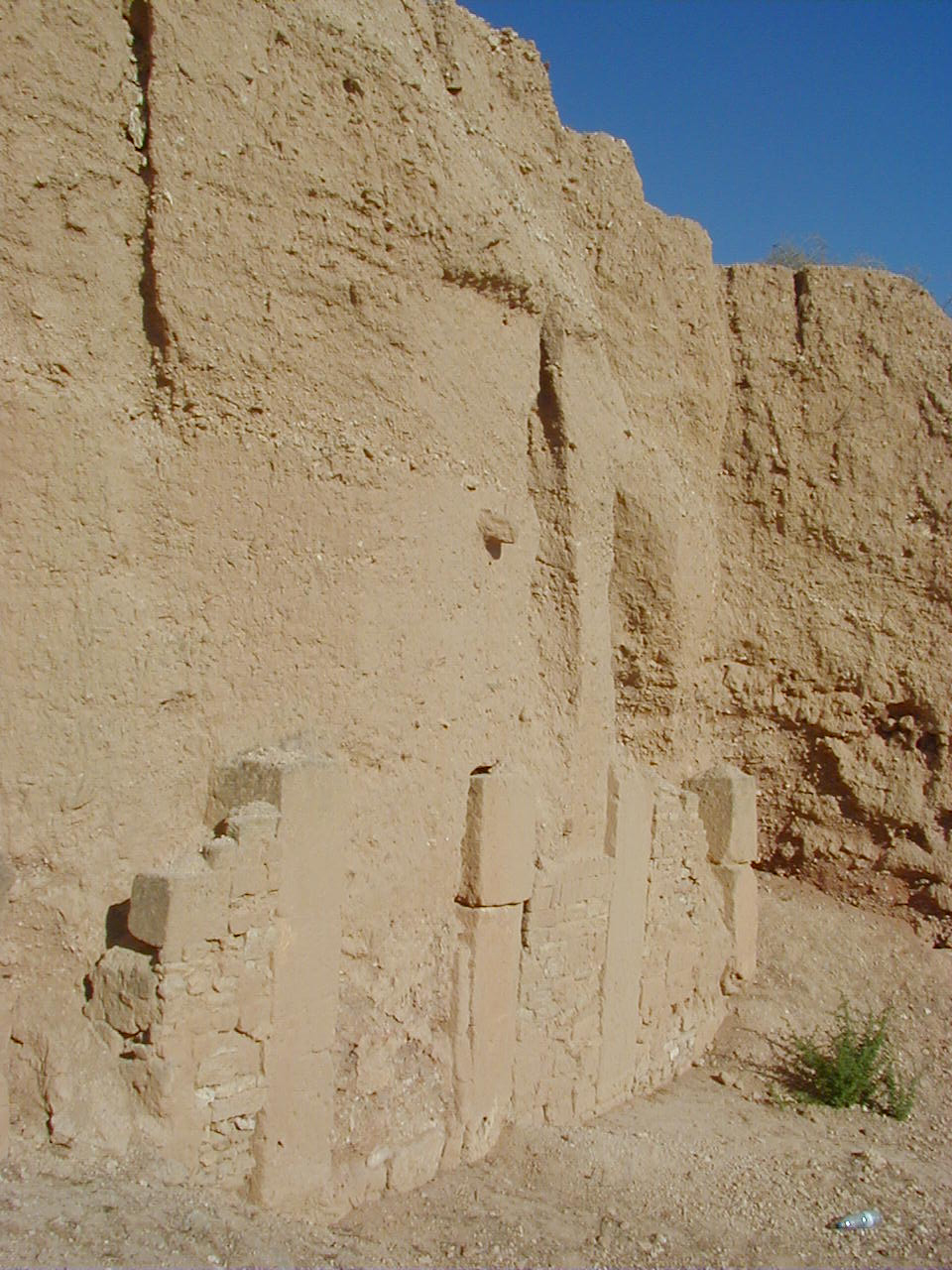
Roman embankment above Punic ruins.

The latest research (notably by Pierre Gros) has highlighted the eminently political character of the monumental adornment of the Colonia Iulia and the time lag between these constructions and the expansion of private buildings.

However, excavations are very difficult on such a surface, the site being occupied by the Cathedral Saint-Louis and the former buildings of the White Fathers’ convent.

A watercolor showing the Romans’ leveling works on the hill, as well as a model of the forum, are visible at the National Museum of Carthage. The preserved remains in the archaeological garden area are extremely limited, the most telling being those of the apses discovered by Beulé and those of a basilica on the eastern flank of the hill.

=== Theater and odeon ===
The theater from the 2nd century underwent significant restoration, with the Roman-era remains being very modest. Of the building designed to accommodate 5,000 spectators, only weak ruins remained at the beginning of the 20th century, both of the tiers and the stage or the frons scaenae.

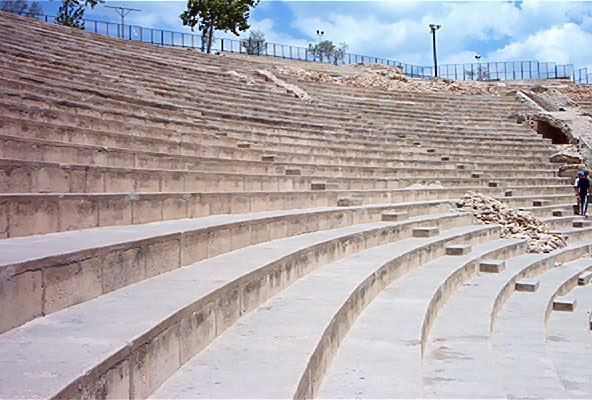
View of the restored tiers of the theater.

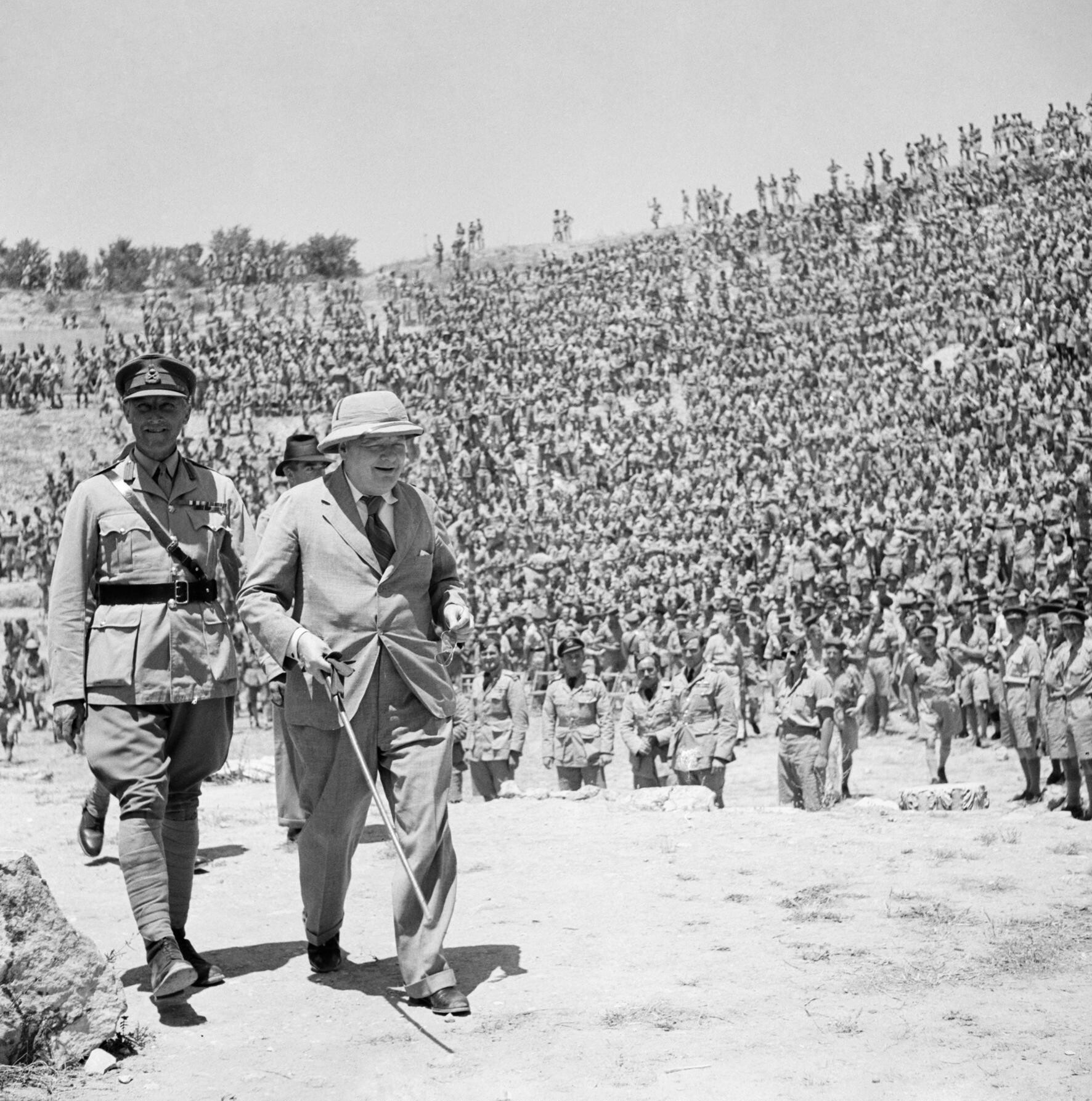
Churchill at the Carthage theater before British and American soldiers on 1 June 1943.

The building is of an intermediate type between the Greek theater, whose structure was dug into the ground, and the Roman theater, often built on open ground. Excavations revealed an early destruction by the Vandals, followed by occupation of the site by an indigent population. It is hard to imagine that this building could have aroused the admiration of authors like Apuleius due to the richness of the marbles and various decorative elements.

This deliberate will to destroy to recover materials confirms the qualifier attributed to the people responsible for such acts by the Abbé Grégoire. However, many statues were discovered there, now deposited at the National Museum of Bardo, including the famous "Apollo". At the beginning of the 20th century, the theater served for various performances, notably plays in antique-inspired costumes. Historical speeches were also delivered there, including by Winston Churchill during World War II. Nowadays, the place hosts the International Festival of Carthage every year.

Of the odeon, only a few remains survive. Their state allows one to realize the restoration work carried out on the theater, which is adjacent to it, to give it its current appearance. Excavations were undertaken from 1994 to 1999 on this building, whose structure was entirely built. We know from a text by Tertullian that its construction dates from the reign of Septimius Severus.

=== Baths of Antoninus ===
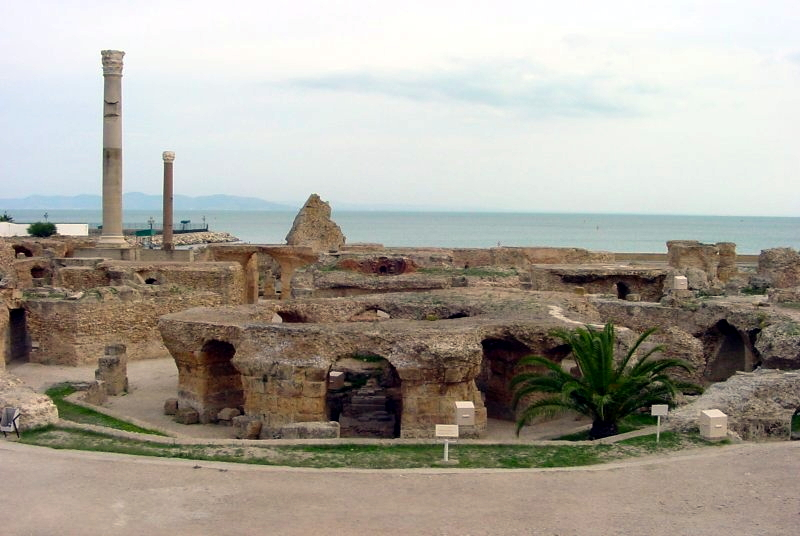
Ruins of the Baths of Antoninus.

The Baths of Antoninus were built by the sea after a large fire that ravaged the city in the 2nd century, more precisely between 145 and 162. Even though the building constitutes the most important thermal complex in Carthage, it was not the only one, although no elevated part of similar buildings remains. Restorations took place after an earthquake in the 4th century.

After the collapse of part of the vaults of the frigidarium at the end of the 4th century or the beginning of the 5th century, the building continued to be used, with disuse dating from 638 according to Alexandre Lézine. He worked particularly with Gilbert Charles-Picard during the post-war period on the clearance, study, and enhancement of the ruins within the archaeological park. Only a few vestiges of the ground floor, consisting of service spaces near the shore, remain from the original installations. The baths served as a stone quarry for centuries, and we owe to them numerous monuments in Tunis and many cities in the northern Mediterranean basin, such as Pisa.

Abdelmajid Ennabli and Hédi Slim have said the building was no more than "a colossus felled and stripped of almost all its architectural and ornamental elements." Moreover, the topography of the place has changed considerably since antiquity, with humans having drained an initially marshy area, and the shoreline being much less clear than it is now. Furthermore, the level of the Mediterranean Sea has risen by about fifty centimeters, engulfing part of the remains, including the swimming pool. The ruins extend over a length of more than 200 meters along the coastline. The anastylosis of a column of the frigidarium by a Tunisian archaeological mission during the international campaign led by UNESCO (1972–1992) gives an idea of the magnificence of the place at the height of the Roman city, with the disappeared vaults rising to a height of over 29 meters, equivalent to a six-story building.

=== Amphitheater and circus ===
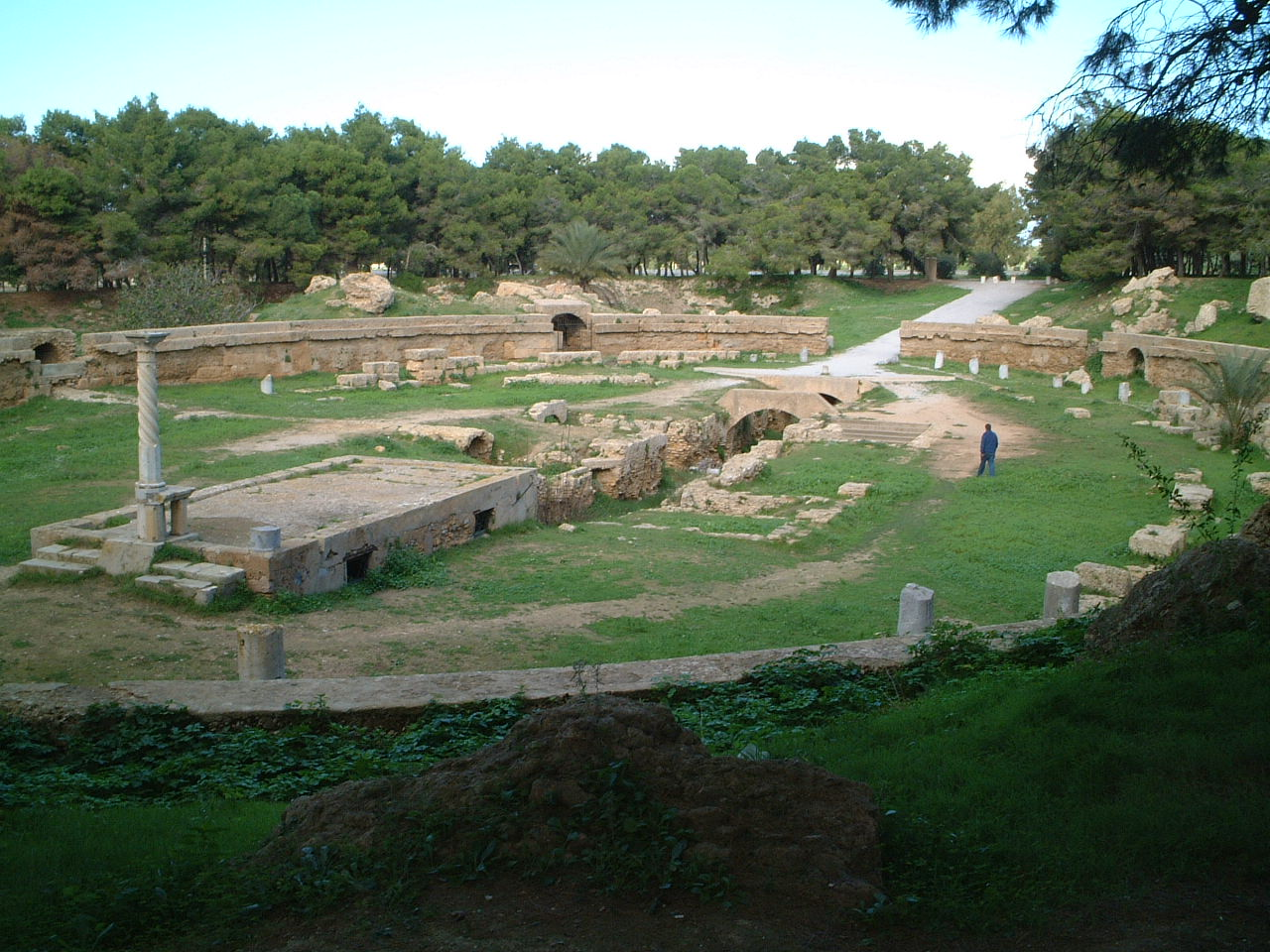
Arena of the Amphitheater of Carthage.

Of the amphitheater with a capacity of 30,000 people, which would have seen the martyrdom of Saints Perpetua and Felicity on 7 March, 203, — a tradition according to all likelihood erroneous, researchers agreeing to place this event in another location, an amphitheatrum castrense whose location is unknown — only the arena remains, the rest having disappeared due to monument looters who plagued Carthage for over a millennium. One can hardly rely on the enthusiastic descriptions of medieval visitors, including Al Idrissi: "At the top of each arch is a round cartouche, and on those of the lower arcade, one sees various figures and curious representations of men, artisans, ships, sculpted on stone with infinite art. The upper arcades are polished and devoid of ornaments."

A similar fate was reserved for the circus, which is now only suggested by a long depression near Douar Chott; a road now crosses it. The excavations of the American team within the framework of the UNESCO archaeological mission allow us to suppose a capacity of 60,000 spectators.

They also demonstrated a late occupation (7th century) by an indigent population, as the burials indicate manifest malnutrition.

=== Columned building ===
Located on the hill of Juno, this building corresponded to an unknown function. Archaeologists have uncovered twinned Corinthian columns, while the floor is paved with mosaics. They consider two hypotheses for its use as a civil building: either as a civil basilica, or as a palaestra of the so-called "Gargilius" thermes, of which it would be the last vestige.

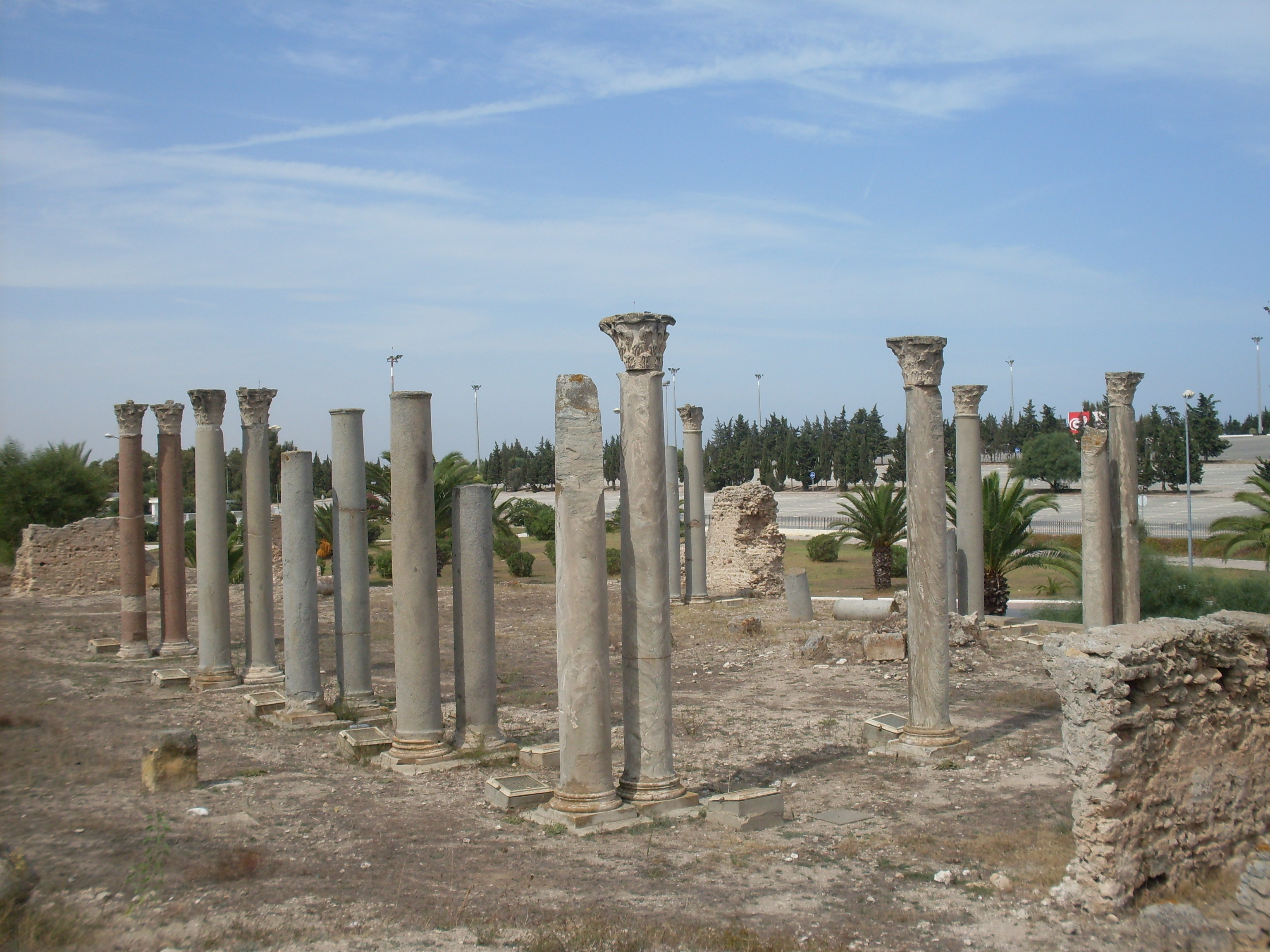
Current state of the remains of the columned building.

A religious activity has been determined for the Byzantine period, with some historians agreeing to make it one of the essential places during the condemnation of Donatism by Saint Augustine in 411.

Near the monument, the mosaic of the horses was uncovered in November 1960, exhibited in the archaeological park of Roman villas.

== Religious buildings ==
Of the buildings with a religious vocation, only tenuous traces remain from incompletely conducted excavations. From the Punics, there is no element of what was their main sanctuary according to the texts, the Temple of Eshmun (Carthage), near the citadel. The remains that survived after the destruction of the Third Punic War disappeared during the Roman development of the hill of Byrsa. However, the sacred area of the tophet remains, with both a funeral and votive character. Nothing remains from Roman Carthage and the main temples located on the capitol, even though some cult statues have survived the centuries.

The Late Antiquity has left a number of basilicas which, with the advent of Christianity and during the episcopate of the bishops of Carthage (including the famous Saint Cyprian), replaced pagan temples when they were not destroyed. They were extensively explored by the White Fathers from the end of the 19th century to the mid-20th century and sometimes underwent untimely restorations, particularly on the occasion of the 1930 jubilee.

Vestiges with a religious character

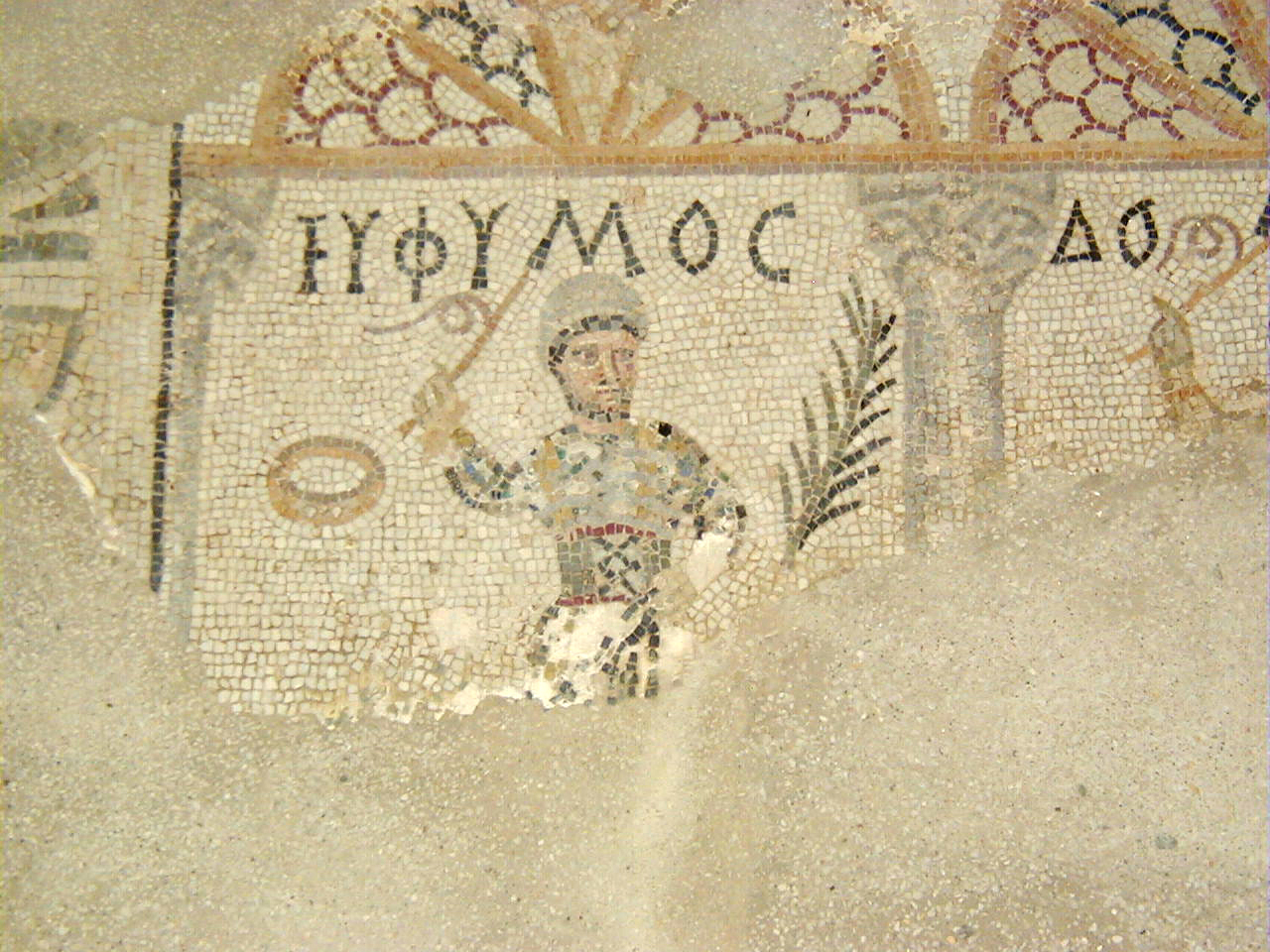
Mosaic of victorious auriges bearing Greek inscriptions.

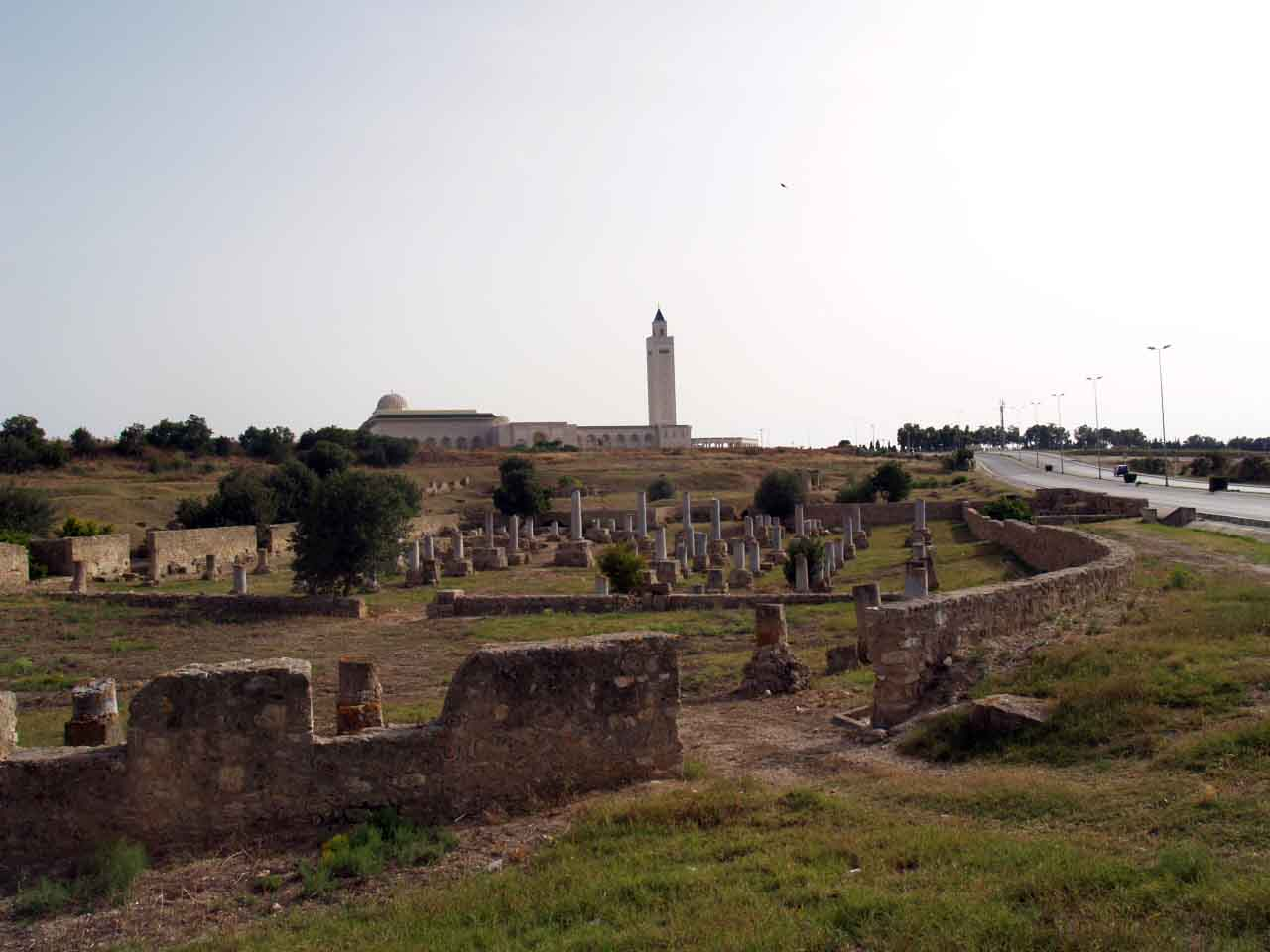
Basilica of Damous El Karita with the Mâlik ibn Anas Mosque in the background.

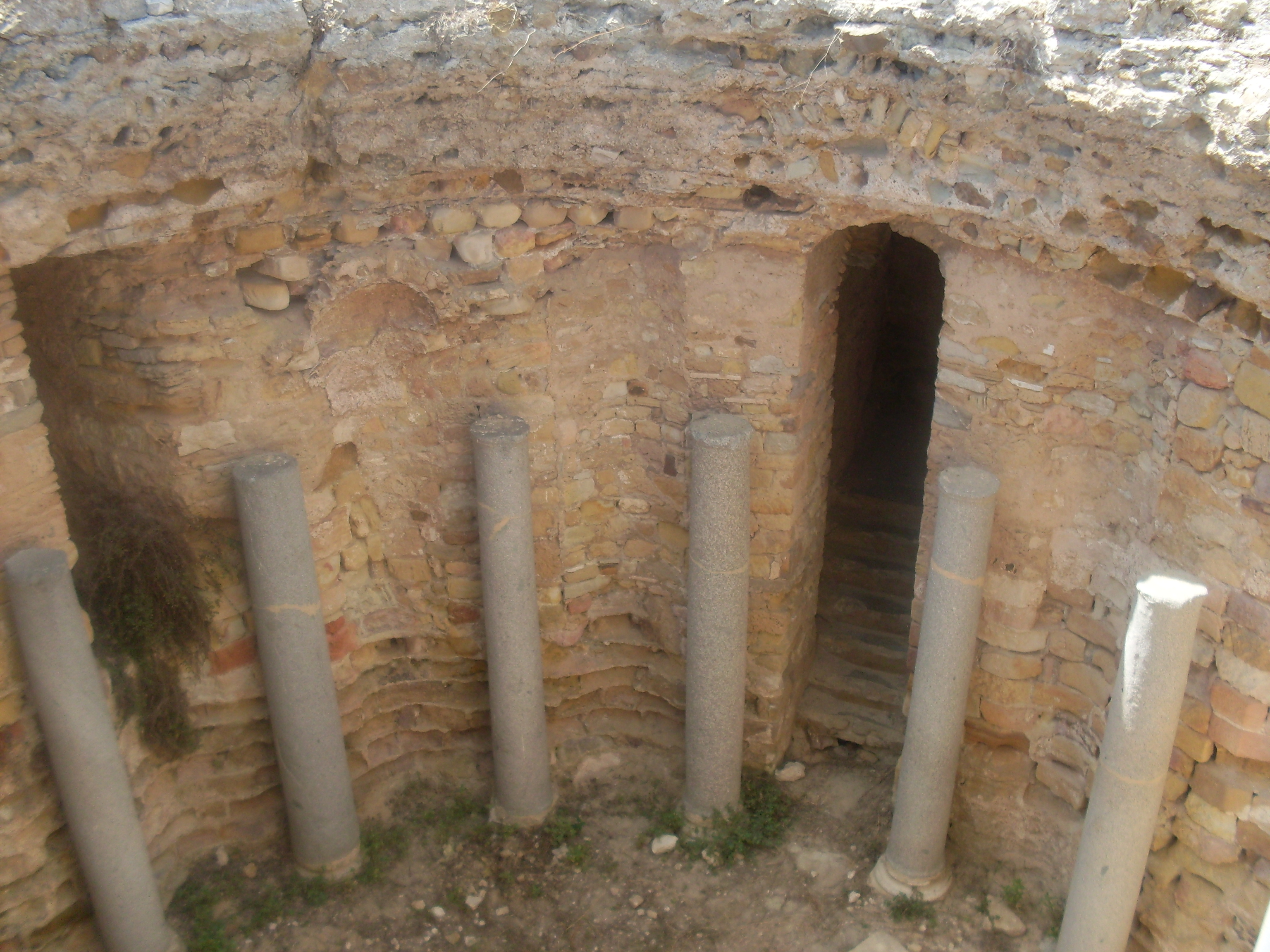
View of the lower level of the rotunda of Damous El Karita.

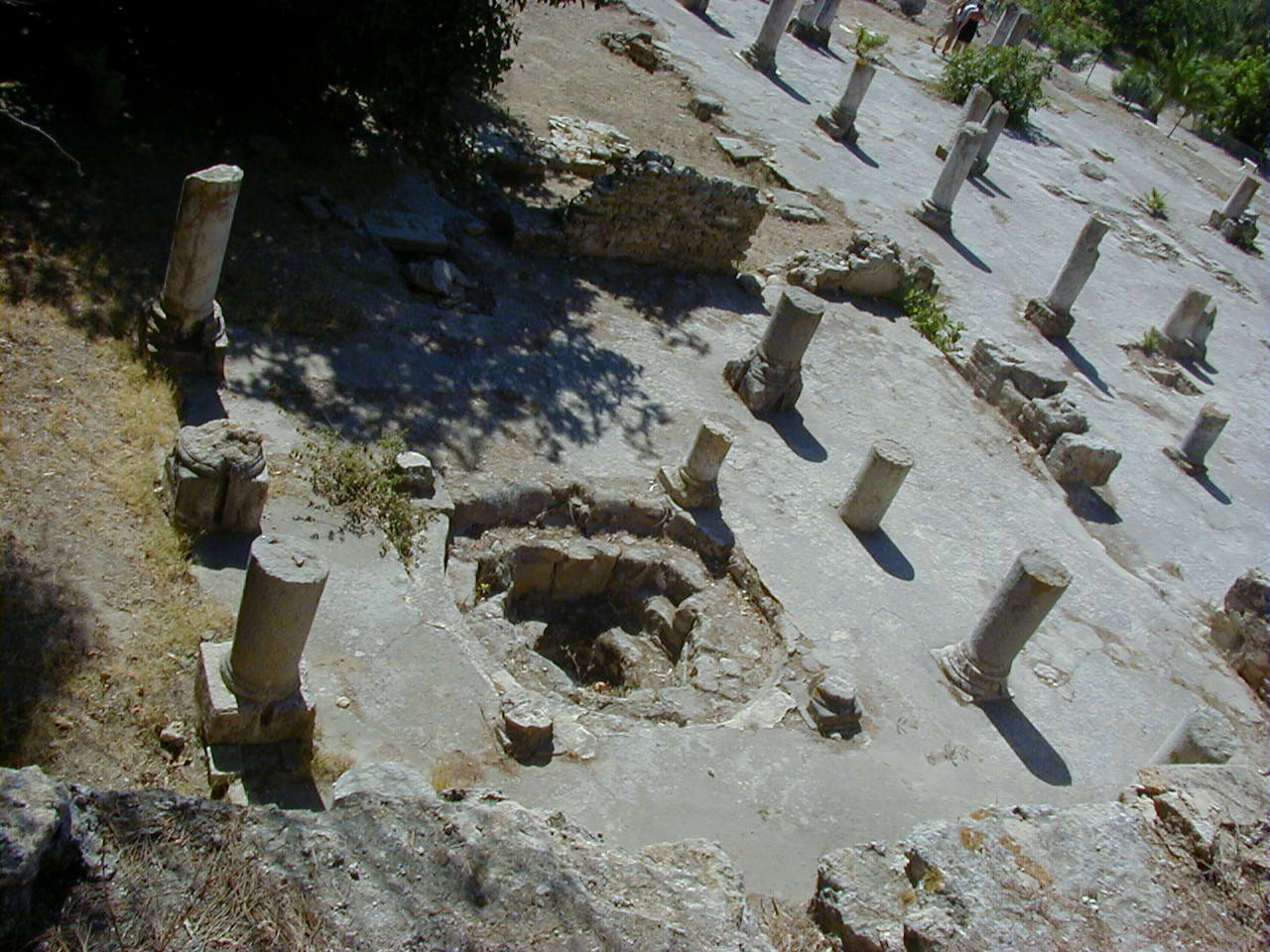
Basilica and baptistery of Douimès.

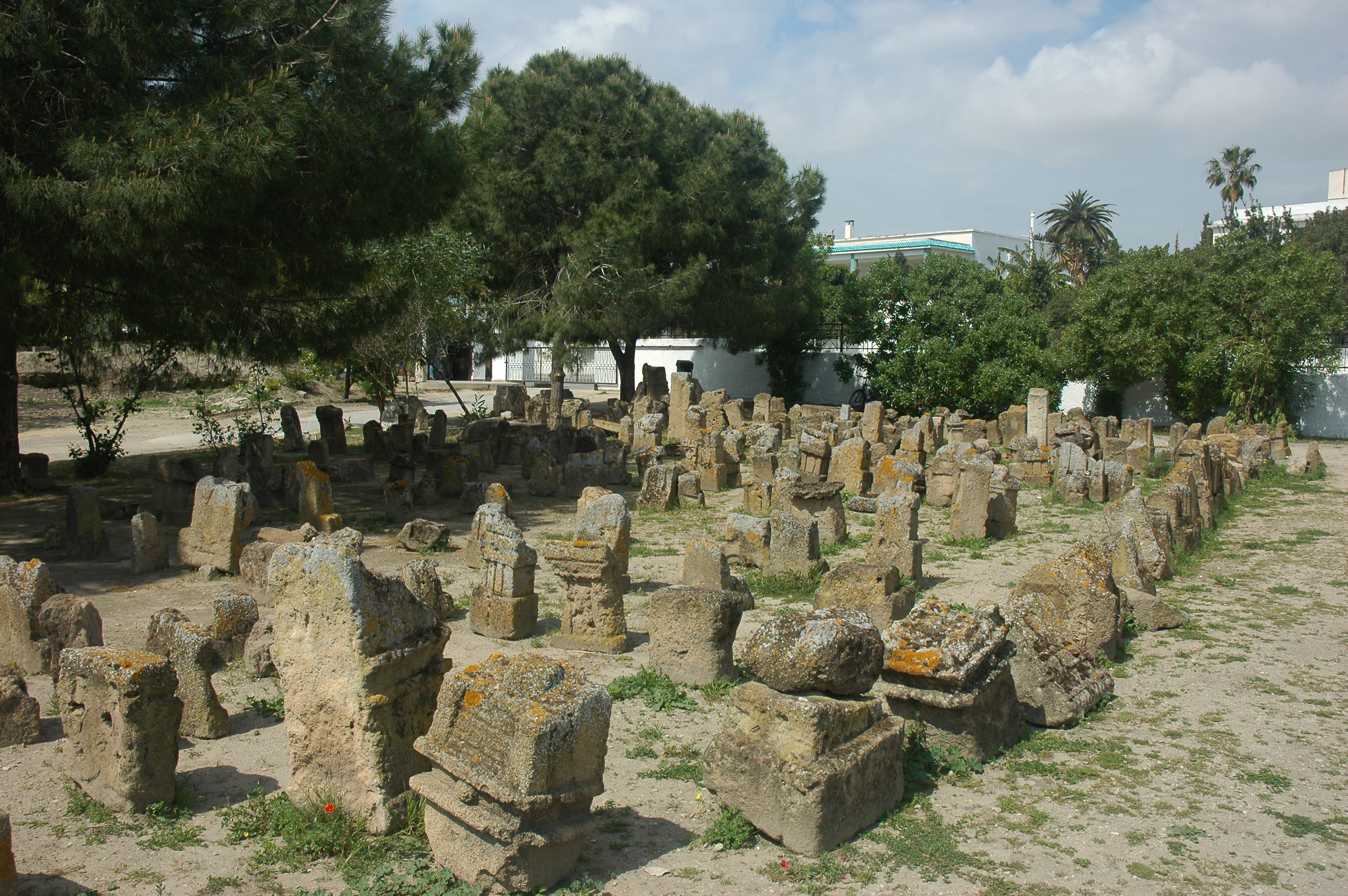
Part of the Tophet of Salammbô site.

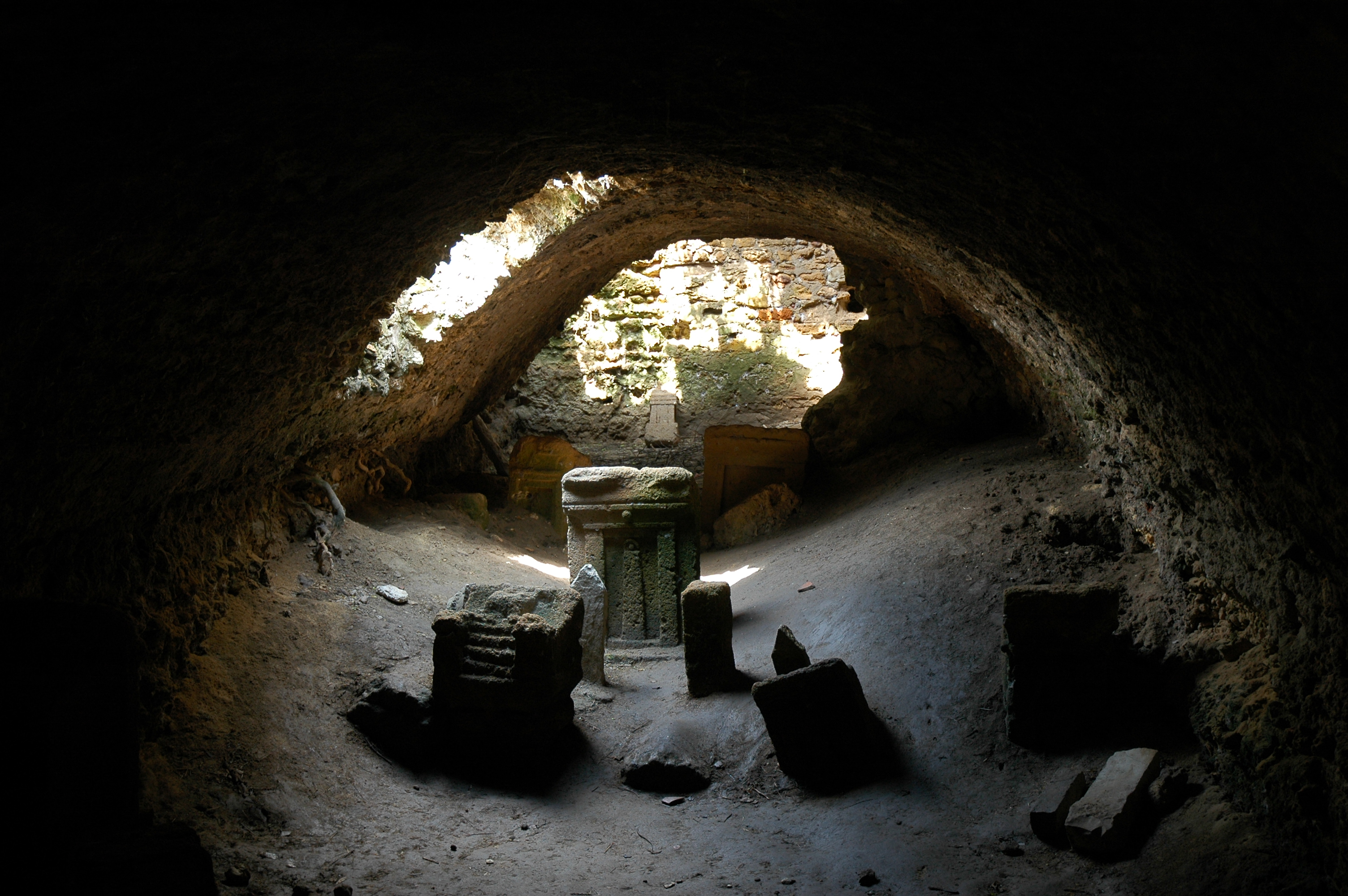
Stelae located under Roman vaults.

=== Tophet of Salammbô ===
The tophet, located not far from the Punic ports, is a sacred enclosure where the Carthaginians would have sacrificed their children to the protective deities Tanit and Ba'al Hammon according to a well-established historiography but questioned by some specialists, particularly Sabatino Moscati. Following ancient authors and a romantic vision favored by Flaubert's novel, a number of researchers believed they recognized in this place the proof of this tradition.

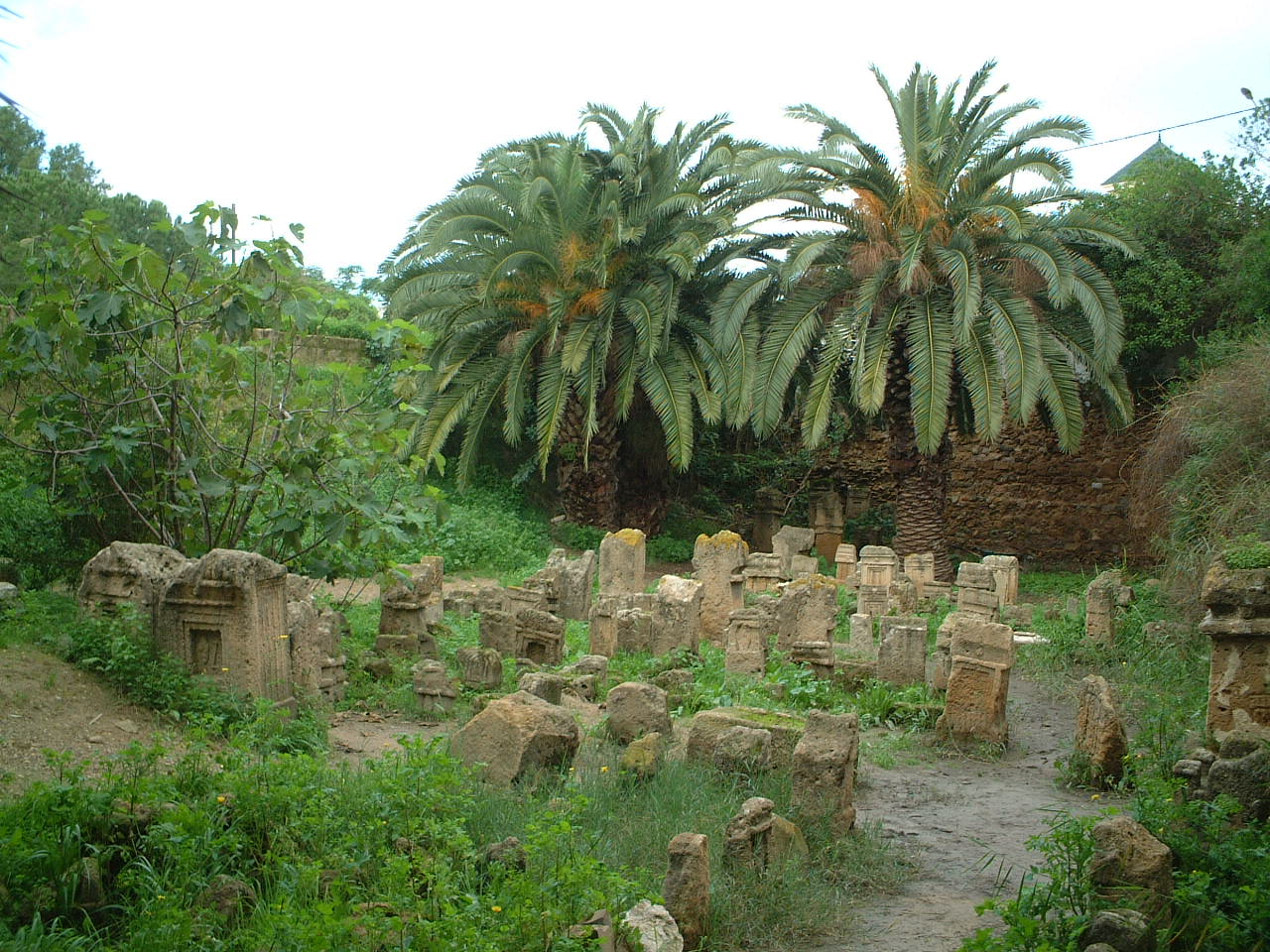
Part of the Tophet garden of Carthage.

Discovered in 1921 by Paul Gielly and François Icard, the space saw excavations interrupted and resumed several times by various teams, the latest investigations being those of Lawrence E. Stager, who places himself in the tradition of the sacrificial place. From the first picks, the remains confirmed the prevailing hypothesis. The stele of the priest with the child weighed heavily in the interpretation. However, medicine has not been able to certify to date that the children buried there were victims of sacrifices, especially since non-human bones were discovered there. These analyses pose more interpretation problems than they provide answers. In any case, the ashes of burned children – beyond the causes of death – were collected in urns and then buried under cippi or votive stelae. When the space was filled, it was backfilled, thus forming a new layer.

Archaeologists have determined three types in the depositions found (Tanit I, Tanit II, and Tanit III), each style characterized by its own features and stelae with marked differences, both in form and in any decoration. A constant must be noted, that of the use of astral symbols and the sign of Tanit.

Similarly, the inscriptions are stereotyped, indicating a dedication for a vow or a thanksgiving following a fulfilled vow. The well-known image of the tophet is constituted by the stelae under vaults which are, however, later, dating from the Roman period. However, the current presentation of the site, even if it is heterogeneous and artificial, mainly highlights ancient stelae made of sandstone from El Haouaria and a small number of later, more worked but more fragile stelae, as they are made of limestone. They are mostly exhibited at the National Museum of Carthage. In Roman times, this space served other uses: warehouses, pottery kilns, and houses, but one also notes a sanctuary dedicated to Saturn, the Roman equivalent of Ba'al Hammon and the main deity of the African pantheon.

=== Complex of the Basilica of Carthagenna and paleo-Christian quarter ===
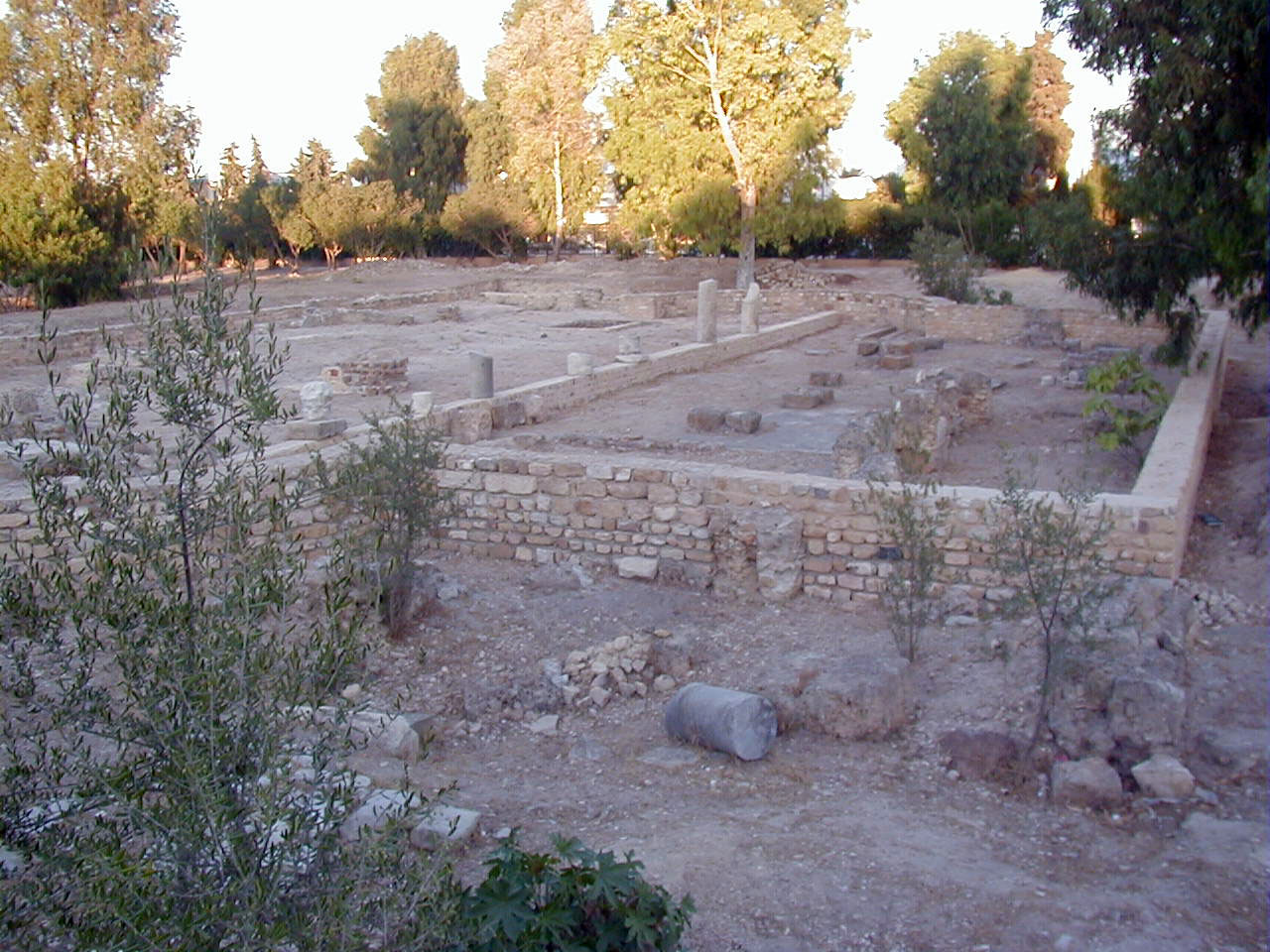
Overview of the ruins of the paleo-Christian quarter.

The quarter called "Carthagenna" was that of "the old ports of the city and the surrounding lands" according to Father Delattre. The southern part of this quarter is now called "Salammbô." The quarter dating from Late Antiquity was cleared by archaeologists. Two buildings succeeded each other there, including a columned building from the end of the 4th century. Its religious, more precisely Christian, function was determined by its decoration. It is therefore a unique case of a known church in Carthage for that period.

This place also houses a large paleo-Christian basilica with five naves and two apses, built in the 6th century, to which a baptistery was added. A number of remains related to the building allow interpreting the whole as an ecclesiastical complex.

A small museum was built to preserve some objects from the site or its surroundings. Among other remarkable elements are a mosaic bearing Greek inscriptions, the mosaic known as the Greek auriges, which gave its name to the villa where it was found, and a statuette representing Ganymede, discovered broken in a cistern, probably broken during its installation and immediately thrown into the place from which it was exhumed.

=== Basilica of Damous El Karita ===
The Basilica of Damous El Karita, on the plateau of the odeon, was cleared in 1878 by Father Delattre, one of the first to have excavated the site. It is the first Christian monument discovered in Carthage, and it is assumed that the current name comes from a deformation of the Latin domus caritatis (house of charity).

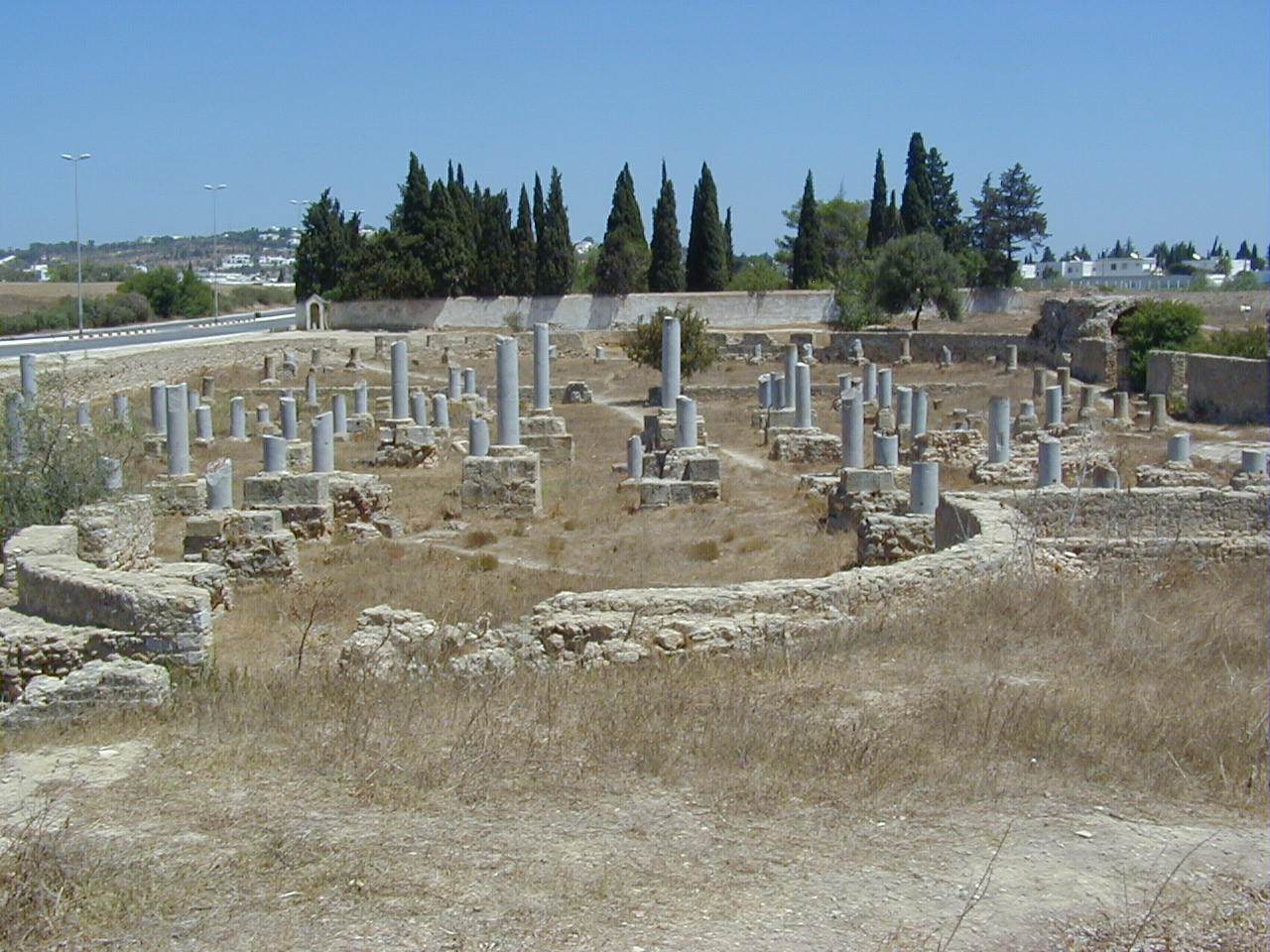
Basilica of Damous El Karita viewed from the west.

Intensive research to find tombs and paleo-Christian inscriptions stripped the monument, and its remains are hardly impressive. Moreover, excavated down to the virgin soil, it underwent untimely restorations in 1930. Fortunately, earlier documents allowed identifying the various phases of the building, whose first state seems to date from the end of the 4th century. An immense building at the beginning (measuring 65 meters by 45 with nine naves and eleven bays for the central space), the site consists, in addition to the basilica, of a baptistery and a complex that may have housed monks. In its last state, the monument is greatly reduced (three naves and five bays only), denoting a strong degradation.

Near the remains, one can observe a circular monument partly underground, which some archaeologists believe was intended to honor martyrs. For others, following Father Delattre, and up to the last excavator of the site within the international campaign, Stefan Boyadjiev, it is a baptistery. Others still see it as having a funeral purpose. The building has never been subjected to exhaustive excavations and remains poorly known. Research nevertheless allows noting that it has an underground rotunda, formerly topped by a dome, accessed by two staircases, suggesting an organized circulation of individuals. In the immediate vicinity, the Mâlik ibn Anas Mosque was built, inaugurated in 2003.

=== Basilica of Saint Cyprian ===
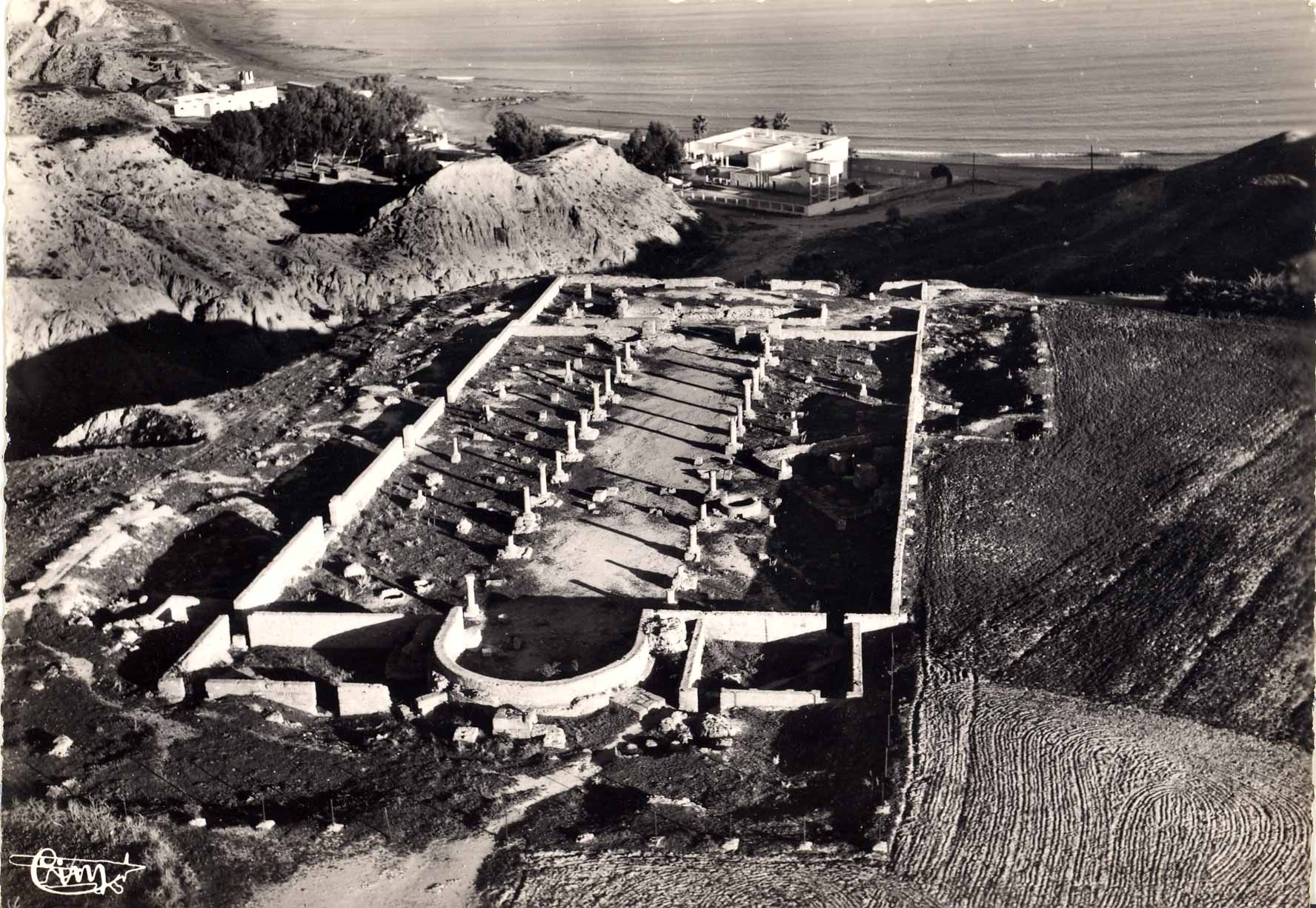
Ruins of the Basilica of Saint Cyprian in 1950.

On the plateau of Borj Djedid, the basilica known as Saint Cyprian was cleared. This vast construction was found in 1915 and identified as the Basilica of Saint Cyprian thanks to a text by Saint Augustine that located it "in front of the city, near the sea."

Consisting of seven naves, the monument was surrounded by a vast cemetery. Here, but in an earlier building, Saint Monica, mother of Saint Augustine, would have spent the night before his departure for Italy.

Benefiting from an exceptional panorama over the Gulf of Tunis and Jebel Boukornine, these remains have been the subject of important excavations, with the removal of ancient slabs and pavements, as well as restoration on the occasion of the jubilee organized in Carthage in 1930 with heterogeneous anastyloses.

The facade accessing the building was near the ravine overlooking the sea, on a site likely dedicated to the safety of sailors for a long time. It is assumed that the body of Saint Cyprian was deposited there, which could explain the long use of the building from the end of the 4th century, including during the Vandal period.

=== Basilica Majorum ===
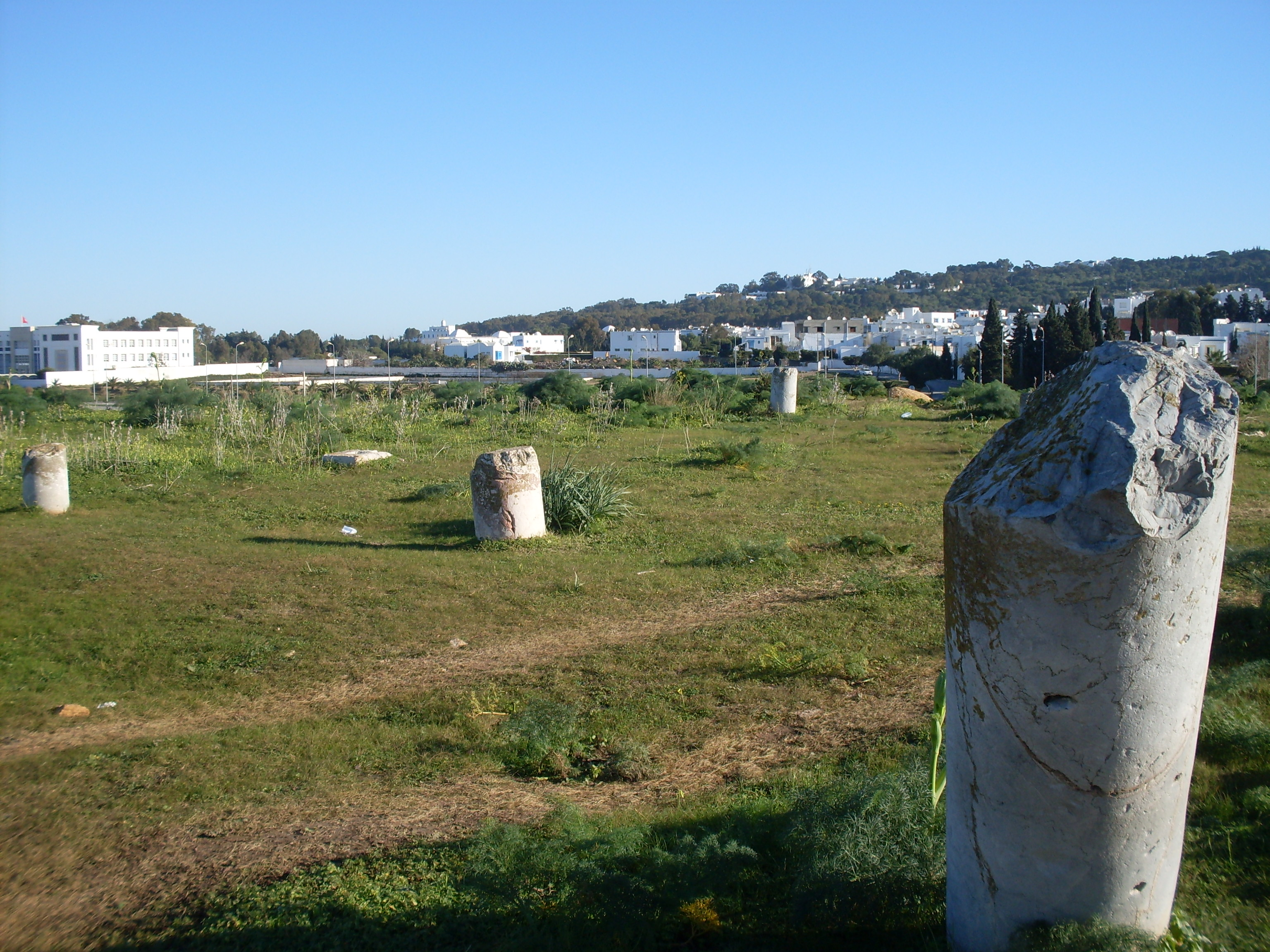
Vestiges of columns of the Basilica Majorum.

On the site called "Mcidfa," a building identified as the Basilica Majorum was uncovered since its discovery in 1906–1909 by Father Delattre. Its use as a pagan cemetery from the 1st century would confirm the hypothesis that it is the basilica maiorum, the burial place of Saints Perpetua and Felicity after their martyrdom. An inscription mentioning the presence of the bodies of the martyrs was found there, which we know from a text by Victor of Vita were buried in said basilica. Saint Augustine preached several sermons there. Moreover, a text by the same Victor of Vita tells us that the church was requisitioned by the Vandals and destined for Arian worship, with the building being returned to Catholicism certainly during the Byzantine period. The abandonment of this place is proven at the beginning of the 7th century, due to the shrinkage of the urban fabric in its immediate environment. As for the identification of this monument with the "Perpetua Restituta," that is, the Catholic basilica of the city, it is not at all proven, with archaeologists having no material element in their possession to date.

Archaeologists have dated this construction to the beginning of the 4th century. The uncovered building consisted of seven naves and thirteen bays; it underwent some transformations under Byzantine domination. Over-excavated, it now presents only column shafts and some surviving walls, not very impressive. This is because it was systematically destroyed.

Already, Father Delattre had noted its poor state, due according to him to the reuse of materials in neighboring habitations. That is why, apart from the other elements of the site, these few remains are left almost abandoned.

=== Basilicas of Douimès ===
The two basilicas called "of Douimès" (a word meaning "vaults") are currently in the archaeological park of the Baths of Antoninus. They were relatively well-preserved when discovered, but the exhibition set up on the site of the basilicas led to very significant degradation of both the structures and the mosaics, due to water runoff and tourist traffic.

The first building, dating from the beginning of the Byzantine period and discovered relatively damaged, included three naves. In its immediate archaeological environment were a Christian cemetery and a Punic tomb from the 5th century BC.

The second basilica was larger, with its five naves and two sacristies. In addition, a baptistery and another element that probably served as a martyrium, a place where worship was rendered to saints, were attached to it.

== Infrastructure ==
The infrastructure of ancient Carthage is relatively well known for the Roman period. The cadastre and centuriation of the space have been the subject of very comprehensive studies. As early as 1833, the consul of Denmark in Tunis, C. T. Falbe, made the first surveys, but other historians of Carthage are not left out, with a long list of works devoted to the subject. At the same time, the organization of the Roman city is fairly well reconstructed. As for the infrastructure of the Punic period, it is little known, apart from a number of cisterns, and mainly concerns the Punic ports, long identified with two lagoons. From the Roman period, the 18 cisterns that constituted the outlet of the Zaghouan Aqueduct to supply the Antonine Baths are particularly impressive.

Elements of the city's infrastructure

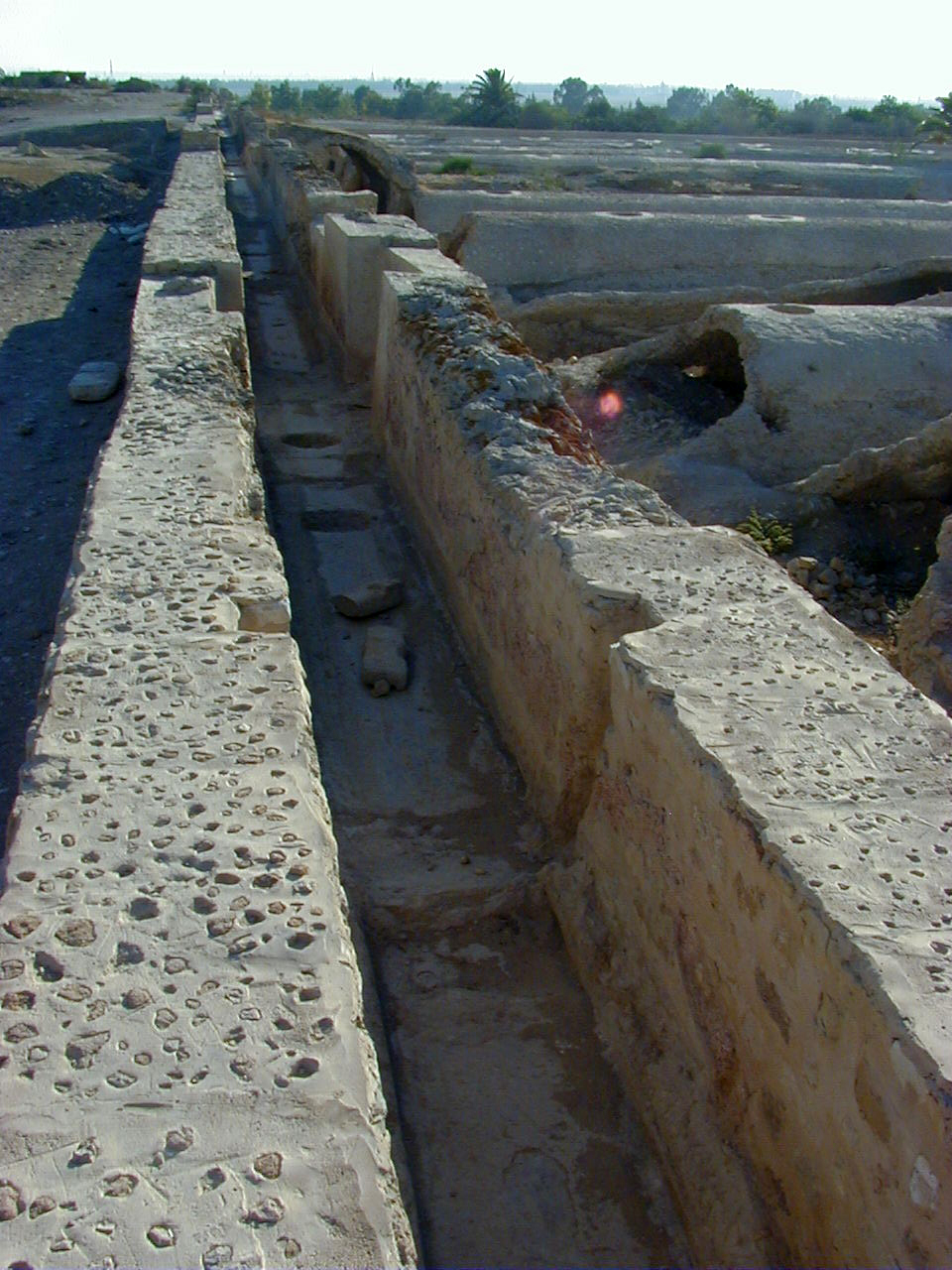
Internal view of the pipeline leading to the cisterns of La Malga.

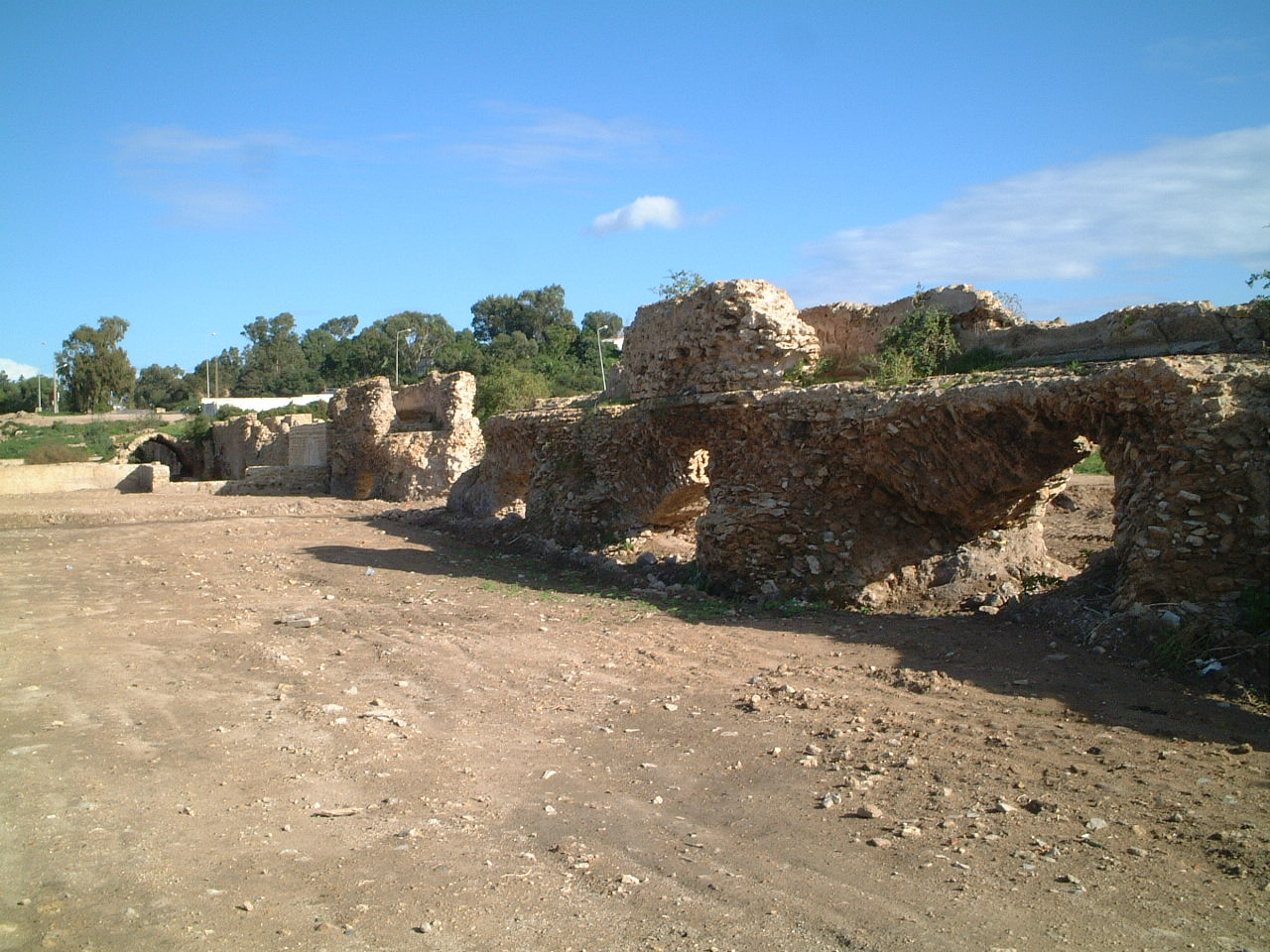
Ruins of the aqueduct from Zaghouan.

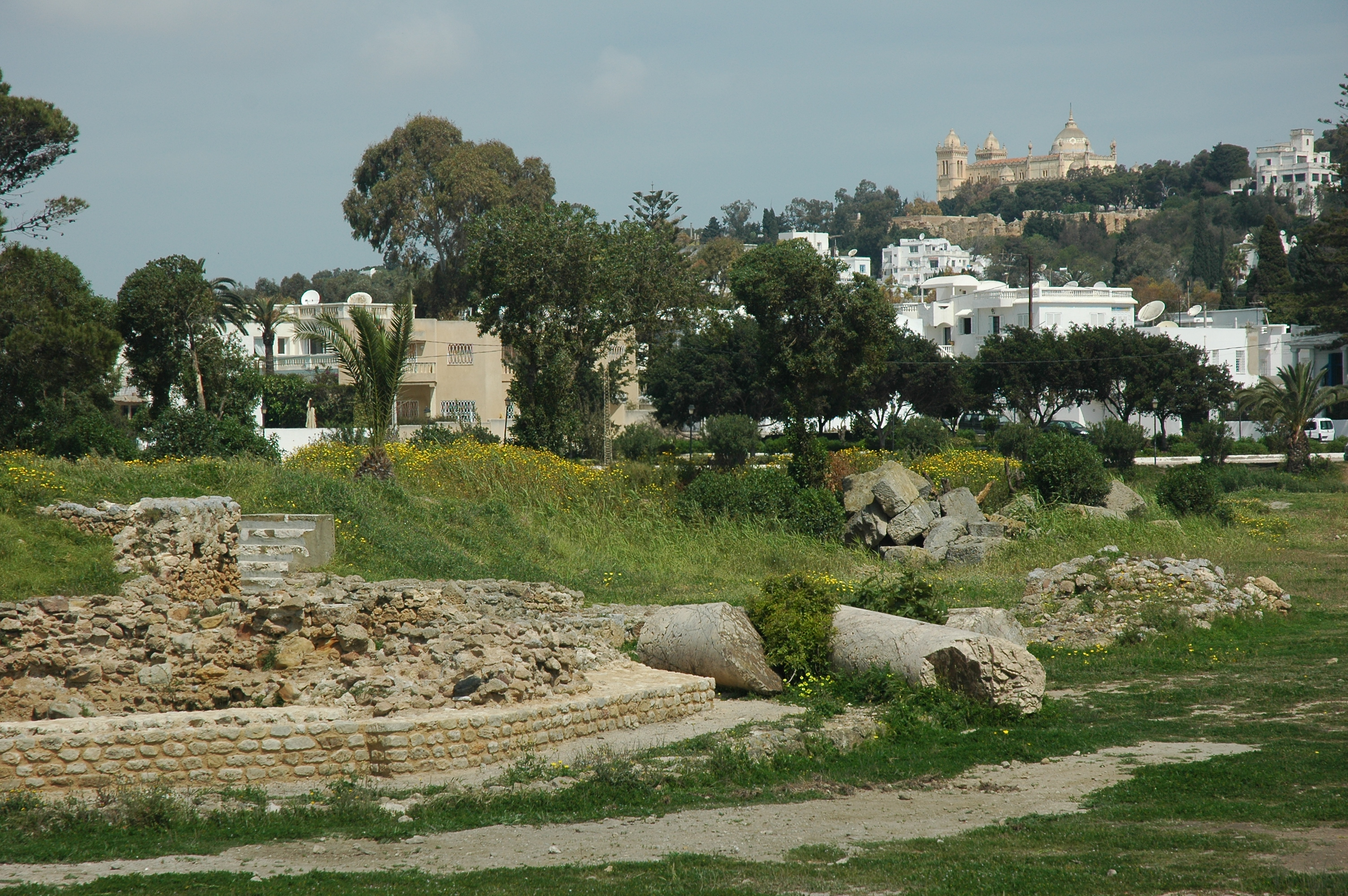
Former Punic ports dominated by the Cathedral Saint-Louis.

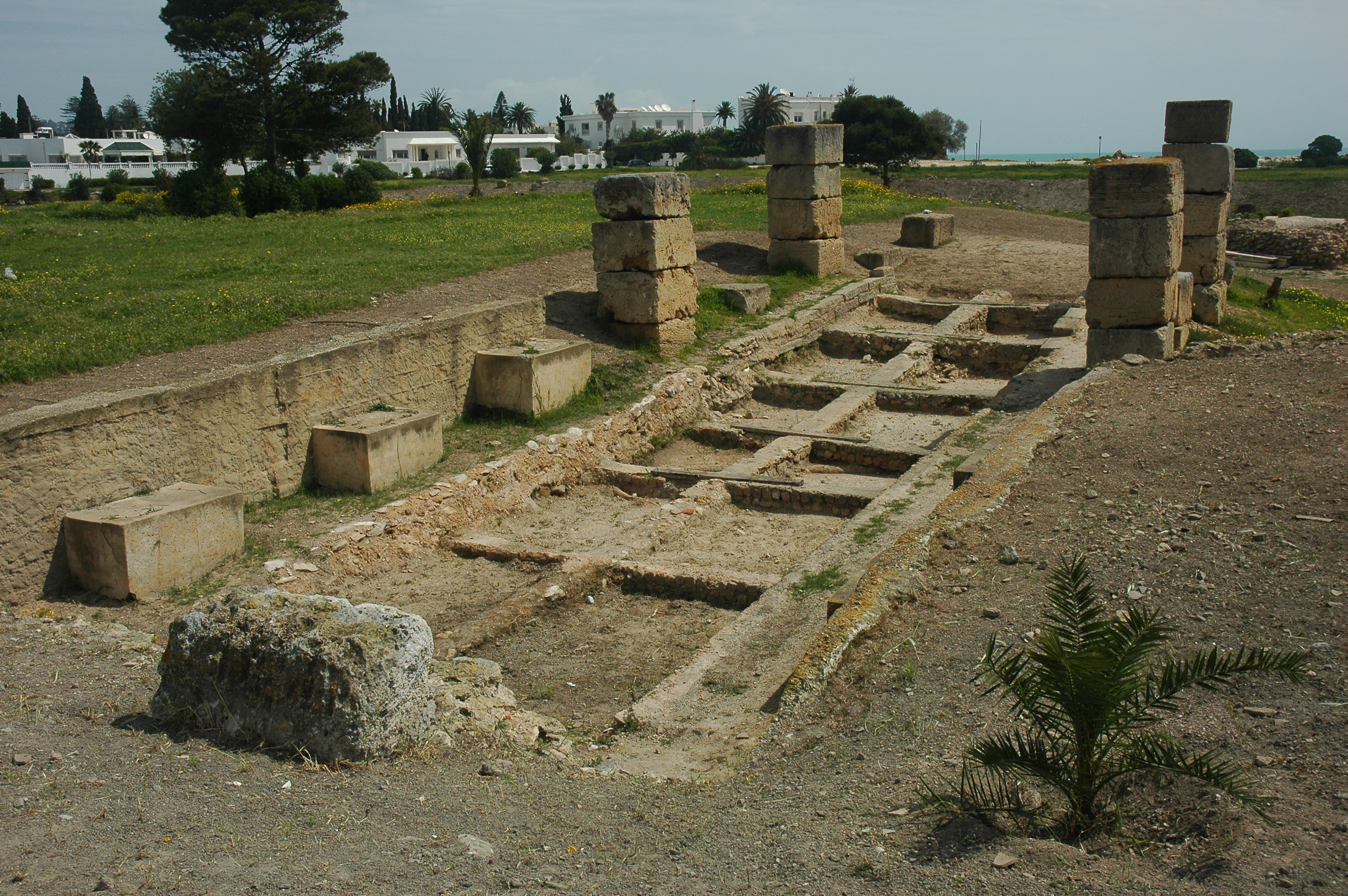
Dry dock of the Admiralty islet.

=== Punic ports ===
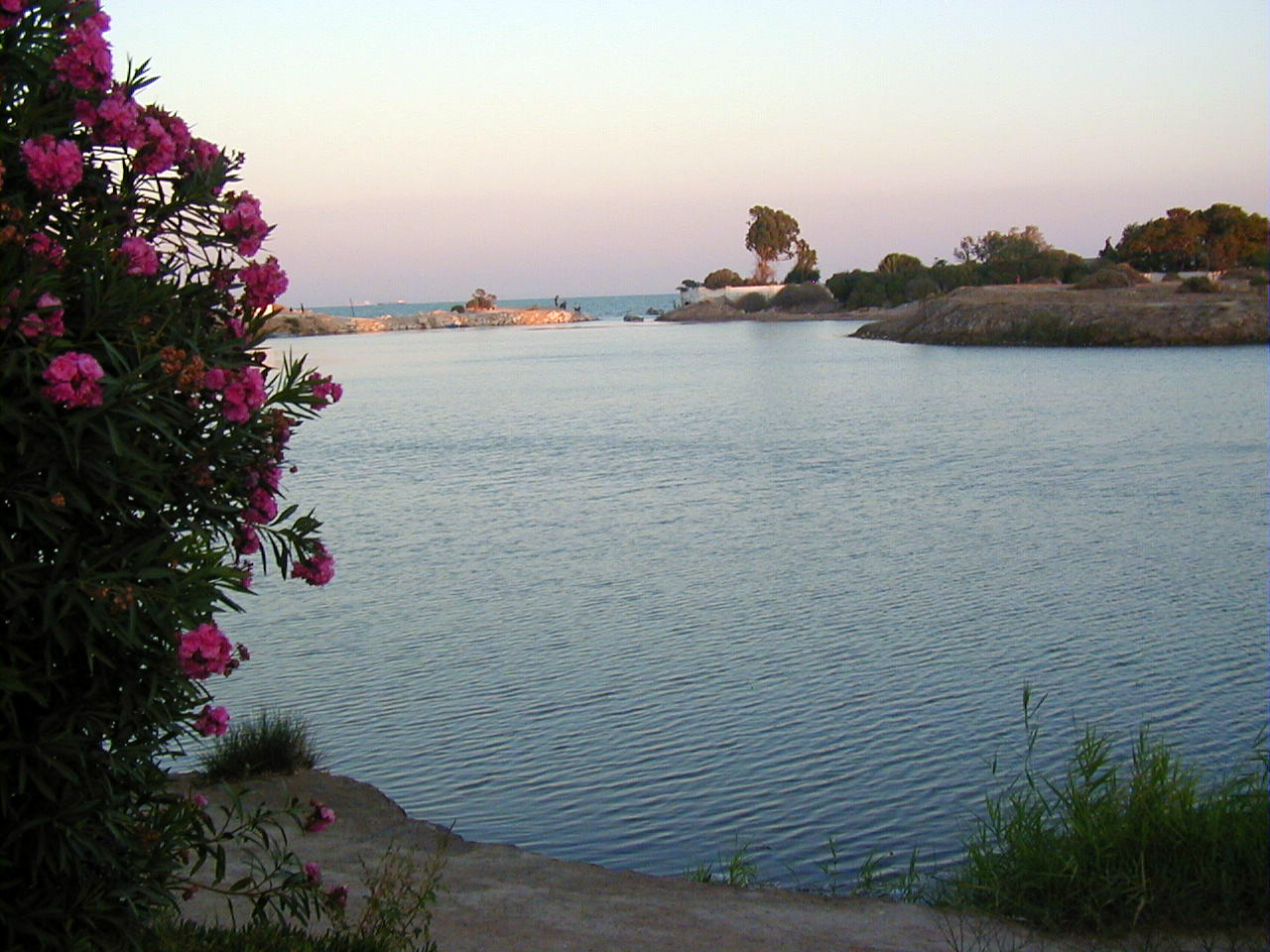
View of the circular port with the sea in the background.

The question of the ports of the city of Carthage is fundamental, given the importance of the maritime world for the Phoenicians. The two current lagoons along the shore, called one "commercial port" and the other "military port" — with the islet called "of the admiralty" in its center, where a dry dock has been highlighted – are perhaps not the essential place that was wanted to be seen there following the assertions of Chateaubriand at the beginning of the 19th century and the abusive interpretation of a text by Appian. The surface of the lagoons, eight hectares for the military port and double for the second, has cast doubt on whether these were the ports of the proud rival of Rome. Indeed, it is attested that the Carthaginians left their ships on the shore at the beginning of their history, but probably also later. The lagoons might only be the cothon of the Punic city in the last half-century of its existence. Around the military port and on the islet, wintering docks were deployed, the number of which has been estimated at about 170. No trace of the navarch’s pavilion is currently visible.

The port quarter was remodeled in Roman times with the development of a public square, surrounded by a colonnade, in the middle of which stood two buildings, including a temple.

Commercial activity remained paramount there, particularly for loading wheat ships destined for the annona.

=== Cisterns of La Malga ===
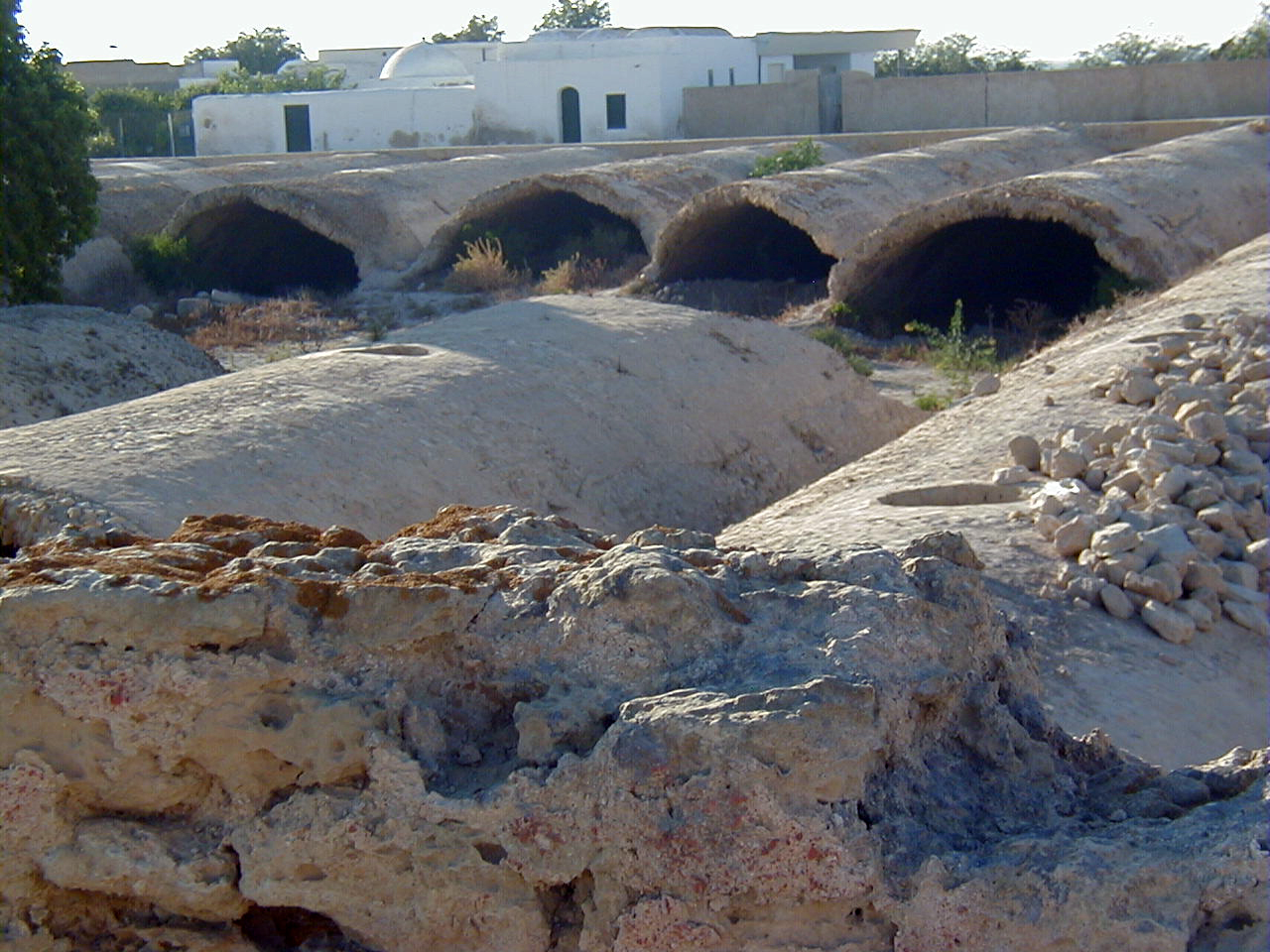
Overview of the cisterns of La Malga.

In the Punic period, there were modest cisterns, as water supply was a private matter. Many Punic cisterns have survived the centuries and allow researchers to work on the density of settlement in the ancient city, particularly in the Megara quarter. Only one hydraulic facility is known, the "fountain with a thousand amphorae", now inaccessible to visitors because it is in the security zone of the presidential palace.

To the north of the Roman city are large, relatively well-preserved cisterns. They formed the main arrival point of the aqueducts that supplied the city, including the famous Zaghouan Aqueduct. A museum has been installed there to show the functioning of these hydraulic installations. The large cisterns, whose capacity has been estimated between 50,000 and 60,000 cubic meters, were connected to the vast complex of the Antonine Baths by mostly underground pipelines using the steep slope of the terrain.

== Major archaeological pieces found in Carthage ==
From the end of the 19th century, the products of excavations carried out in Carthage are mainly shared between the Lavigerie Museum (current National Museum of Carthage) and the Alaoui Museum (National Museum of Bardo). The excavations carried out by the White Fathers did not leave the city, while the research of the antiquities service ended up at the Bardo. Other archaeological pieces, particularly part of those from the Serapeum of Carthage, were deposited at the National Museum of Antiquities and Islamic Art.

=== National Museum of Carthage ===
The National Museum of Carthage is located near the cathedral, in the premises formerly occupied by the White Fathers. It allows visitors to measure the extent of what the city's installations were in the Punic and then Roman periods.

One can see some of the most beautiful pieces discovered in excavations since the 19th century, notably an important collection of baetyls and steles from the Tophet of Salammbô — limestone stelae depicting sculpted elements, animals, plants, or even humans, are particularly remarkable – the marble sarcophagi known as "of the priest" and "of the priestess" (3rd century BC) found in the necropolis "of the Rabs," funeral material such as masks with apotropaic motifs and glass paste jewelry, Roman mosaics, including the "Lady of Carthage", traditionally considered as the portrait of a Byzantine empress; carved elements characteristic of official imperial art, particularly the head known as "of Julia" and representations of Victories from the 2nd century, as well as a vast collection of Roman amphorae.

Pieces at the National Museum of Carthage

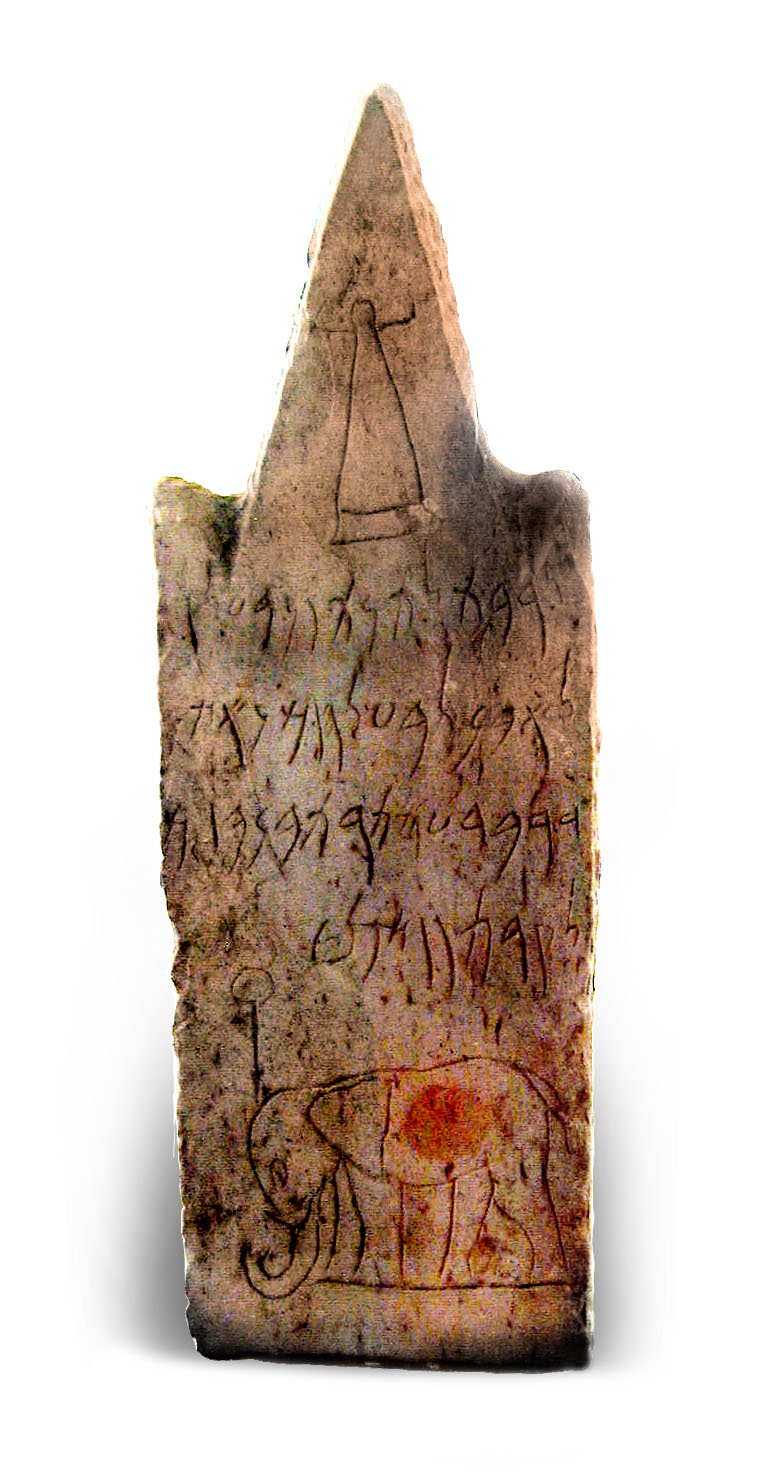
Punic stele with an elephant.

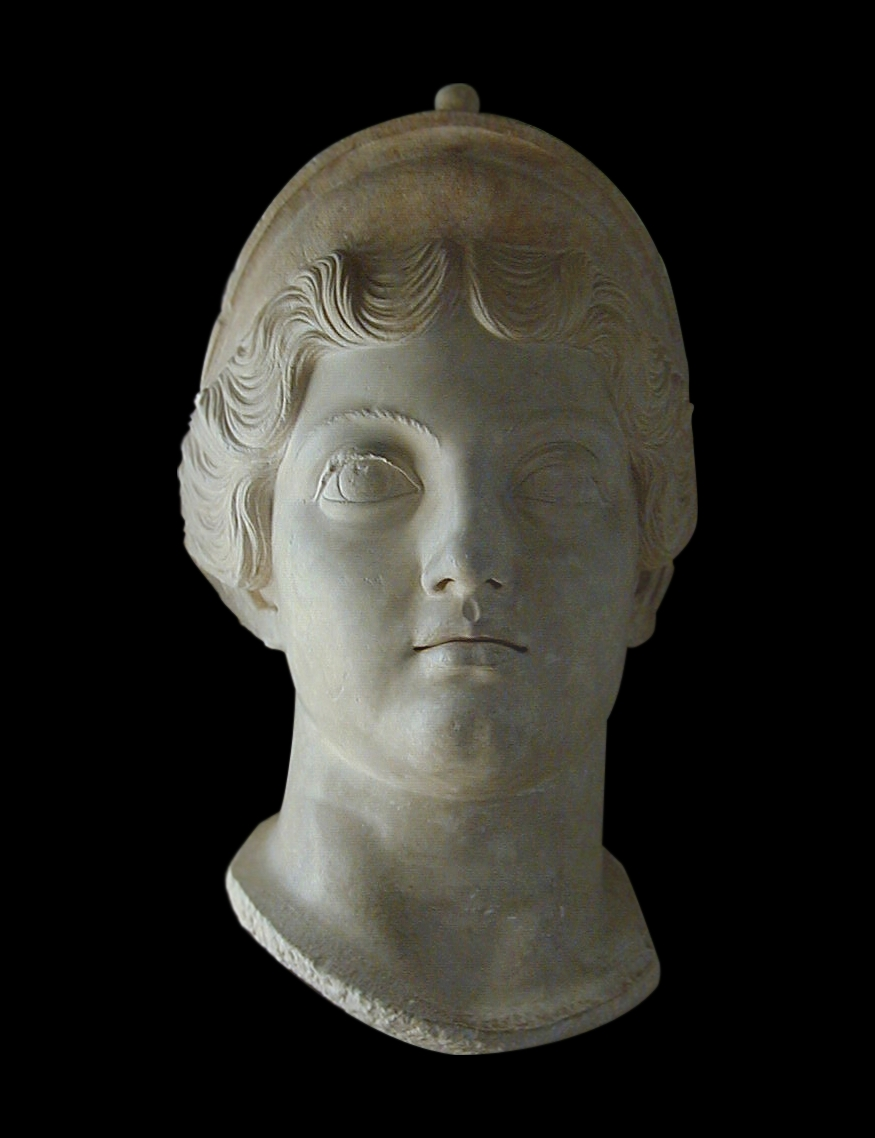
Roman imperial statue.

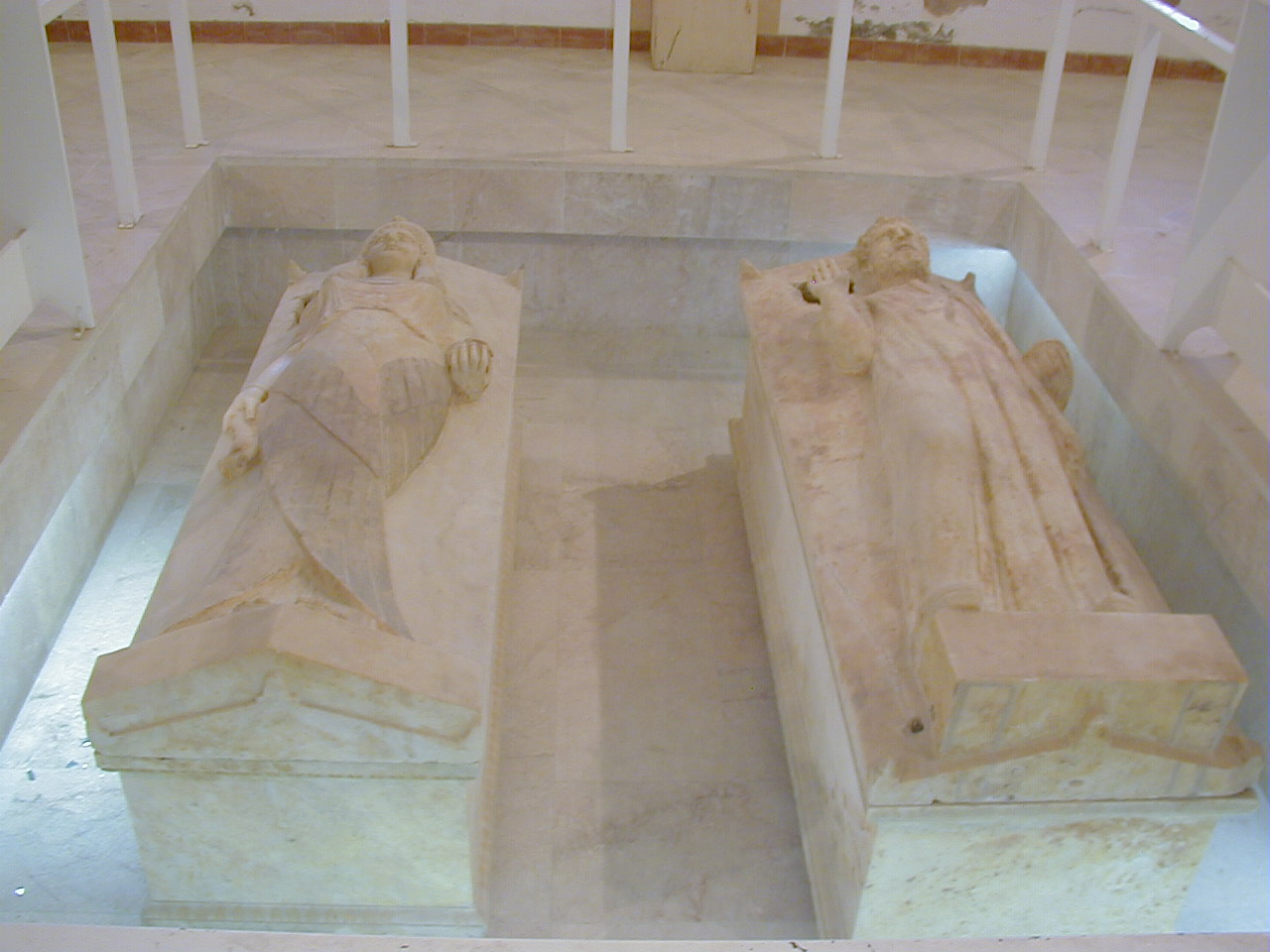
Sarcophagi of the priest and the priestess.

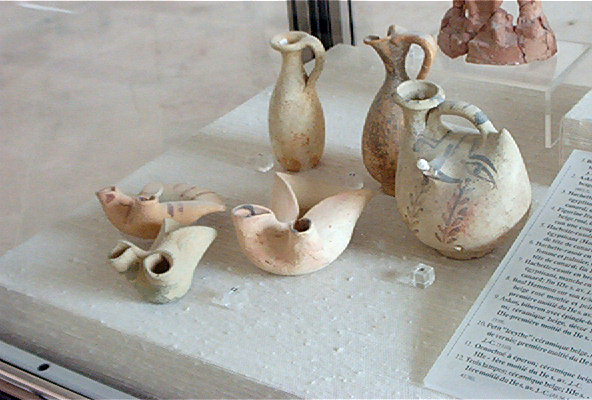
Oil lamps and Punic ceramics.

=== National Museum of Bardo ===
A large number of major pieces discovered in Carthage are now exhibited at the National Museum of Bardo, formerly called the Alaoui Museum and inaugurated in 1882. Known mainly for the richness of its Roman-era mosaics, the museum also possesses some of the most interesting Punic pieces that have come down to us; the Mosaic of Dominus Julius, illustrating life on an agricultural estate in the 4th century BC, has been considered the most complete document on the economy and society of Roman Africa. On three superimposed registers, both the activities of the agricultural estate in different seasons and those of the owners of the place are described. The dimensions of the building represented in the center of the composition testify to the concentration of economic power in the hands of a small number of landowners in Late Antiquity.

The stele of the priest with the child, coming from the Tophet, shows a character wearing the traditional hat of Punic priests carrying a child in his arms. This discovery in 1921 was the starting point of a vast controversy, with some historians wanting to see in it a concretization of the multiple ancient sources evoking the sacrifice of children to the deities Tanit and Ba'al Hammon. The statue of Apollo in white marble from the Cyclades, coming from the theater and depicting the god leaning nonchalantly on a tripod from Delphi around which the serpent Python coils, and a mausoleum found in the cemetery of the officiales and adorned with bas-reliefs are among the most striking pieces, as well as the altar of the Gens Augusta, found near the hill of Byrsa, which takes up on a lesser level the themes put on the agenda by the Ara Pacis, referring to the ancestry of Aeneas and highlighting the virtues, notably religious, of the emperor.

Pieces at the Bardo National Museum

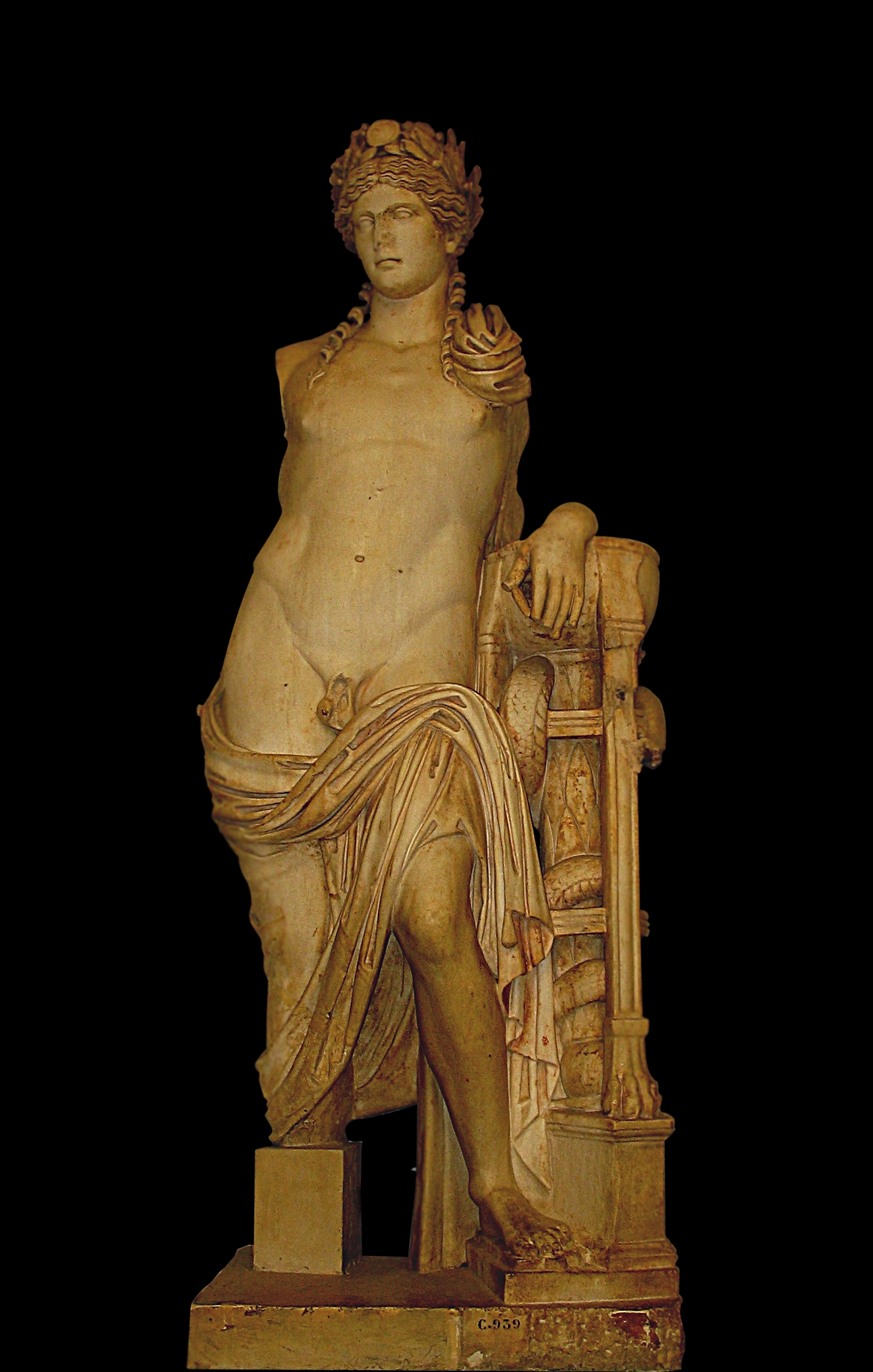
Apollo discovered at the Carthage theater.

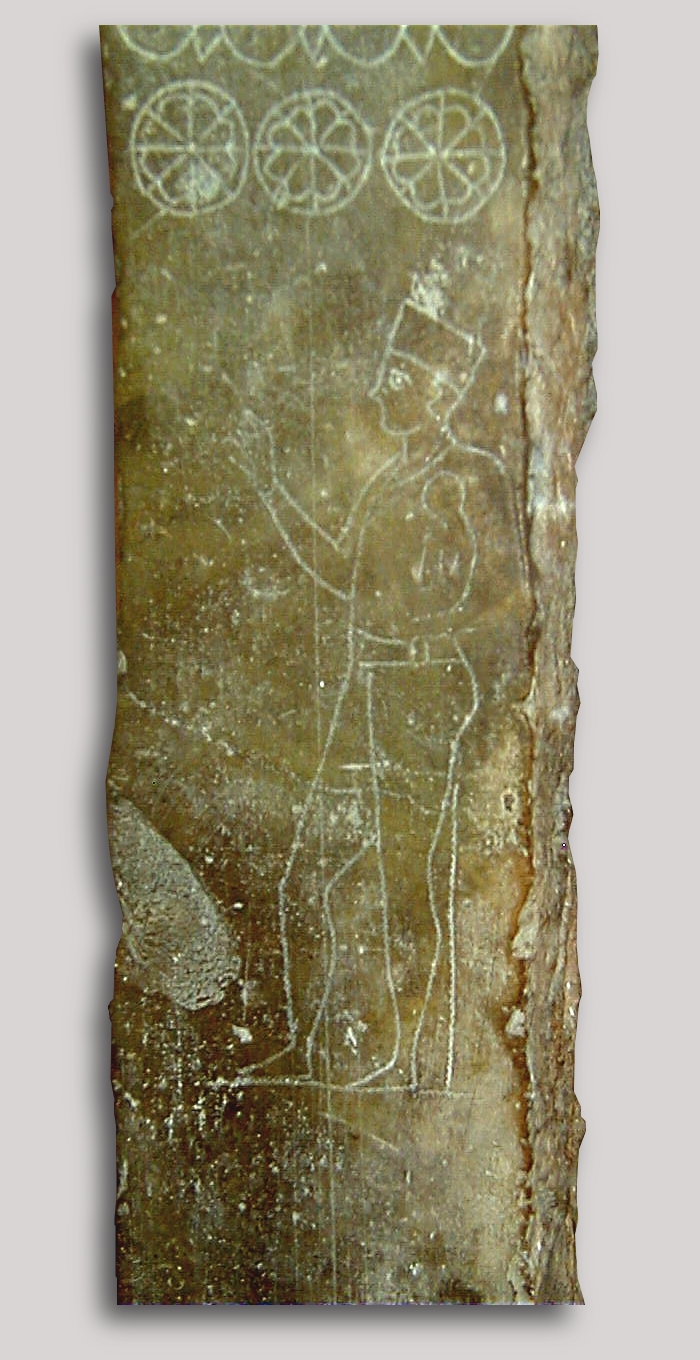
Stele of the priest with the child discovered in 1921.

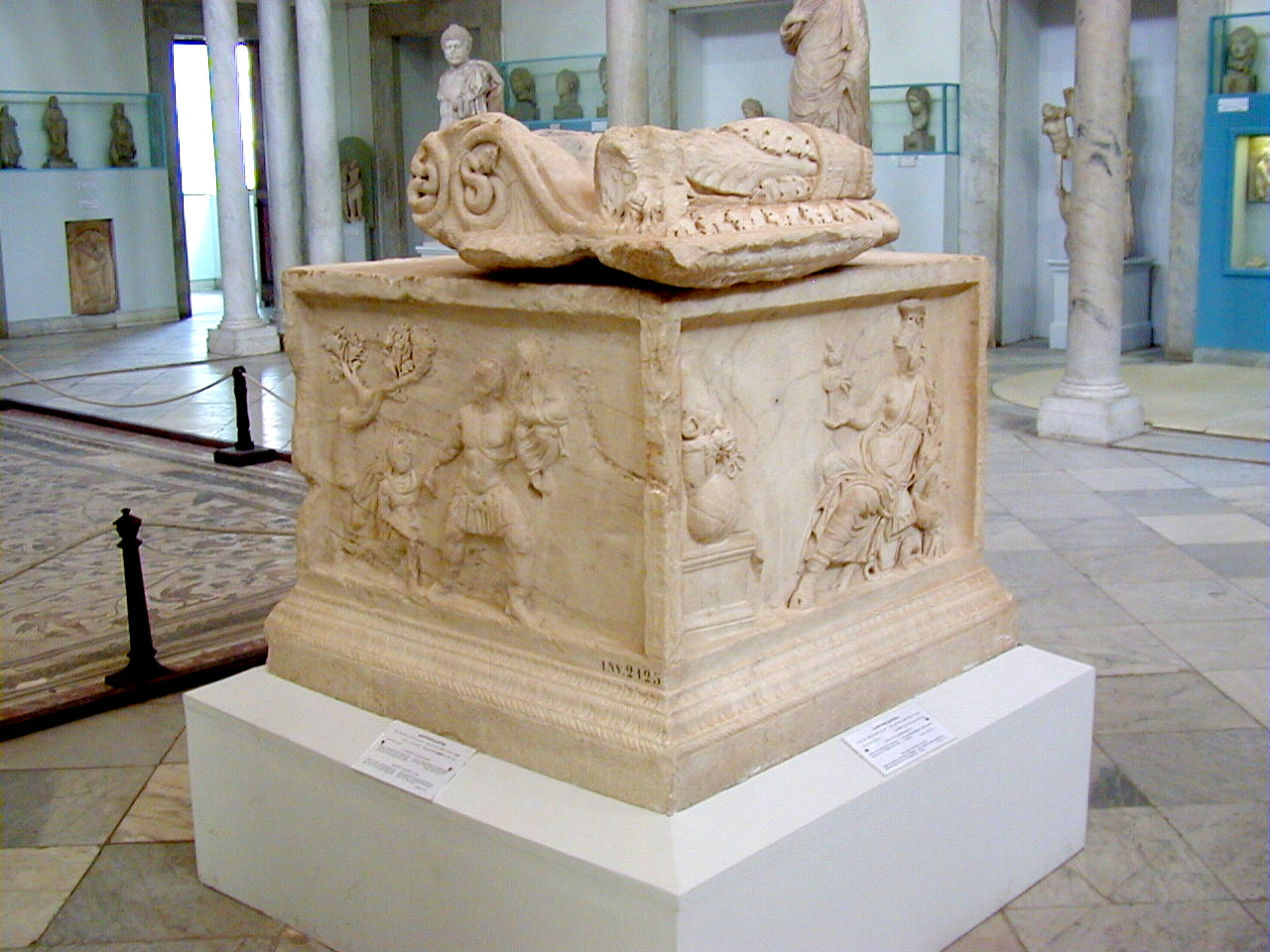
Altar of the Gens Augusta.

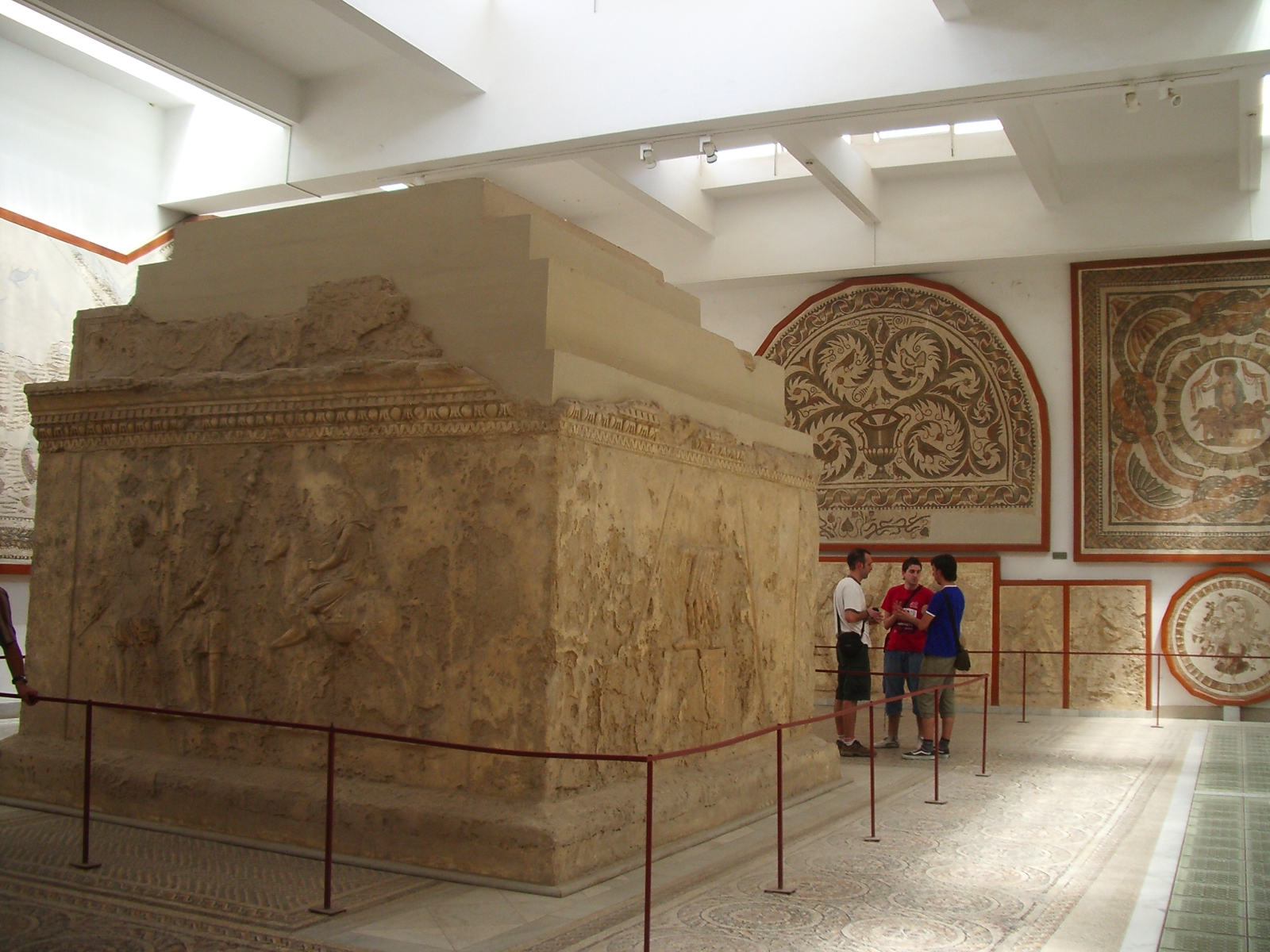
Reconstituted mausoleum.

== Current issues: coexistence between the ancient city and the modern city ==
=== Preservation and classification of the site ===
Faced with the threat of degradation hanging over Carthage, the Director-General of UNESCO, René Maheu, went to the site on 19 May 1972, and launched an international appeal for its protection:

"[...] Even if nothing capital or spectacular were to be found, it is beautiful, it is good, that in this place [...] gathers, coming from all horizons of the world, the great fraternity of those for whom there is no nobler and more enriching quest than that of the truth about man. To the harsh voice, issuing from the depths of ages which, in each people, tirelessly repeats its message of hatred and which once said Carthage must be destroyed!, let us oppose the call of the future, itself as old as humanity, which has guided it out of darkness. It is the voice of concord, of that Concord under whose sign Augustus built the city that erased the ruins of Scipio. And it is by thinking of our future even more than of our past, of that future so threatened by ourselves, that we say today: We must save Carthage! Together, we will save it."

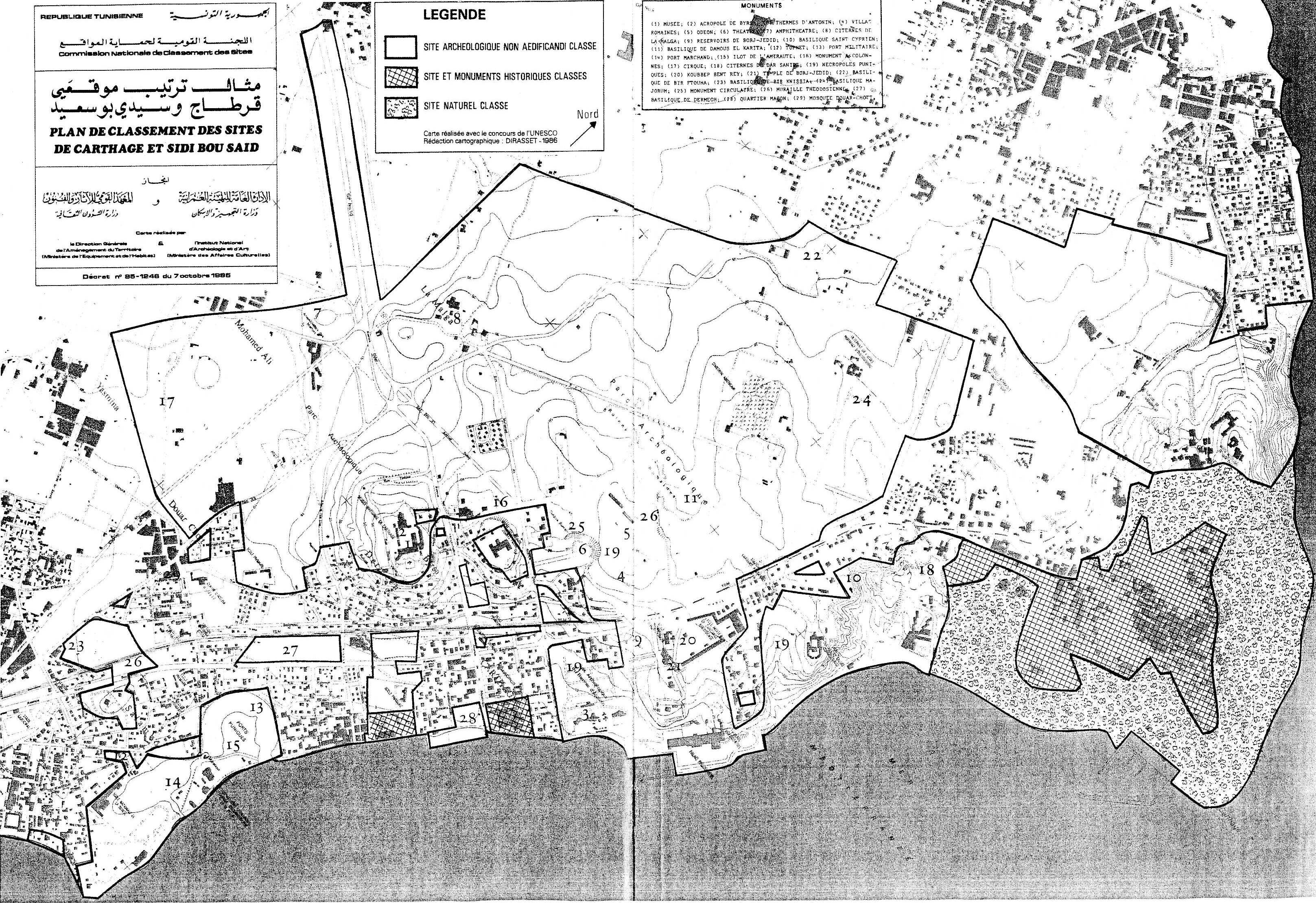
Plan of the classification of the national archaeological park of Carthage-Sidi Bou Saïd.

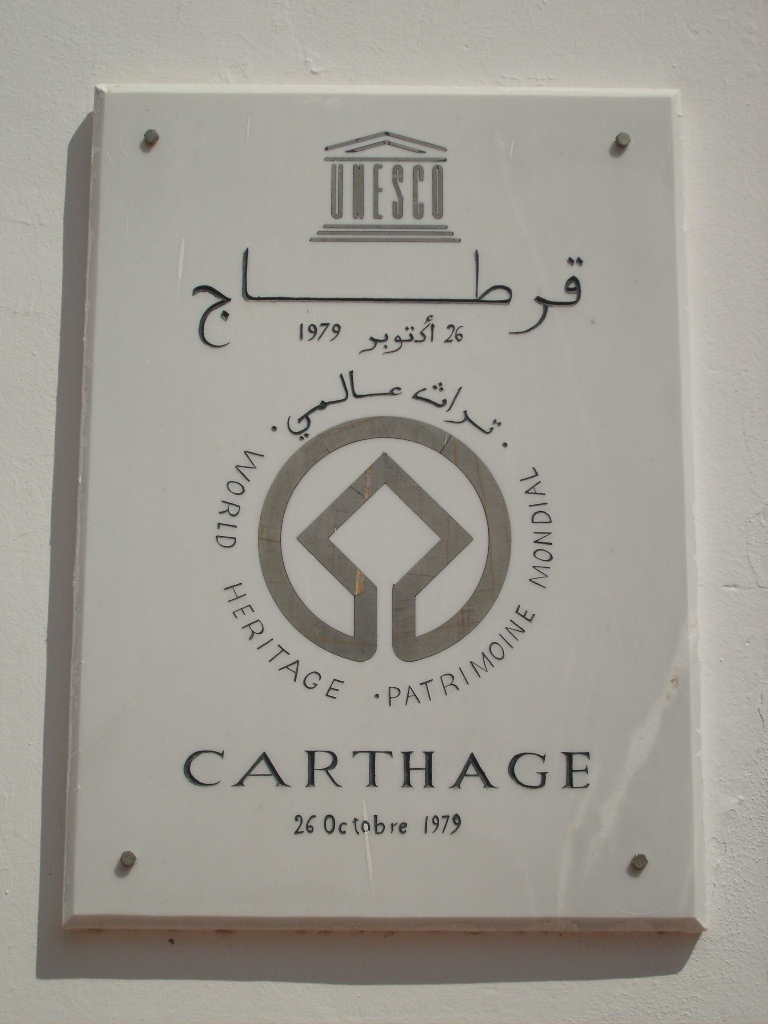
Plaque recalling the site's inscription on the UNESCO World Heritage List.

Following this appeal, an international campaign was immediately set up and lasted until 1992 with the objective, according to the Tunisian archaeologist and historian Abdelmajid Ennabli, to "first excavate, study, then publish, of course, but also consolidate, enhance these remains and make them accessible to the public". During the campaign, the Tunisian government had the site inscribed on the World Heritage List in 1979, on the occasion of the third session of the World Heritage Committee, which took place in Egypt, more precisely in Luxor and Cairo. Subsequently, a classification plan was approved by decree of the President of Tunisia on 7 October 1985: "It is clear that the expected decision goes far beyond the technical and budgetary level. The Carthage-Sidi Bou Saïd park is an act of protection and enhancement of national and world heritage; it is also an act of development and as such, it is also a political act, and it is this political choice that is hoped for".

=== Current threats ===
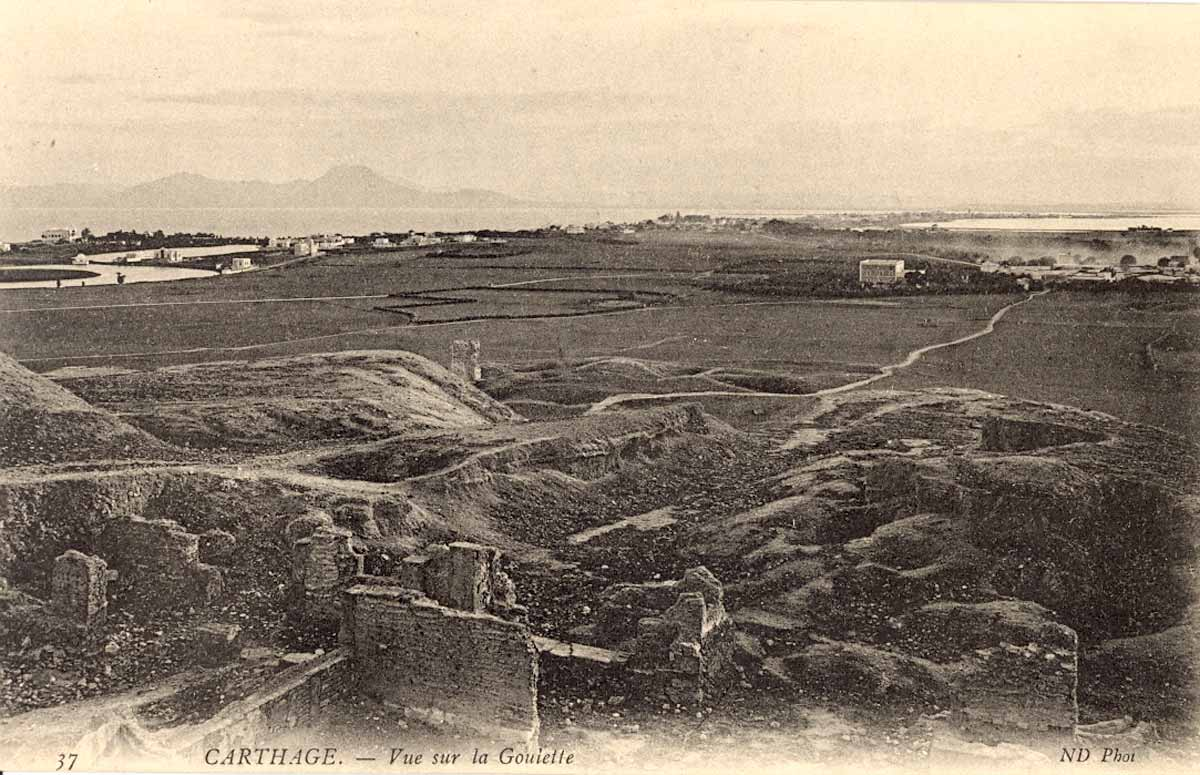
Carthage in 1900 with a view towards La Goulette.

Yet, despite the various preservation measures, the site remains today subject to various pressures from its environment that threaten its sustainability. A depopulated suburb of Tunis at the beginning of the 20th century, Carthage is largely endangered by the rapid urbanization of the 1950s and 1960s, particularly the demographic expansion of Greater Tunis, which has grown from 300,000 to more than two million inhabitants since the end of World War II

The proximity of the Carthage Palace built at the end of the 1950s and the prestige of the name of the ancient city make it an "emblematic place of power", according to Sophie Bessis, and a highly sought-after quarter, particularly by embassies. Many villas are also built there. However, in the face of this surge, some scientists are moved to see the site condemned to be, at best, inaccessible to researchers and, at worst, a victim of concrete mixers.

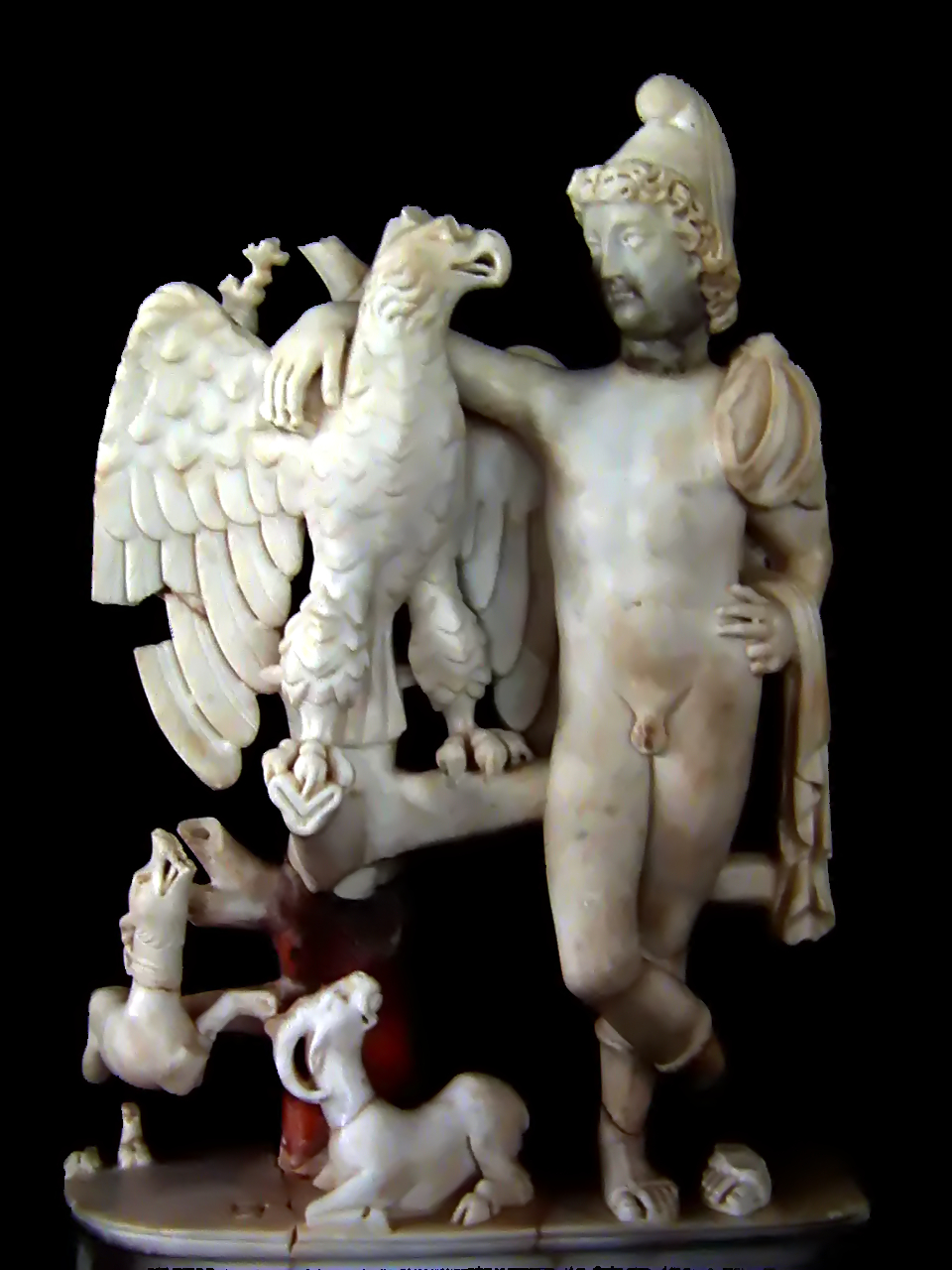
Small statuette of Ganymede with the eagle.

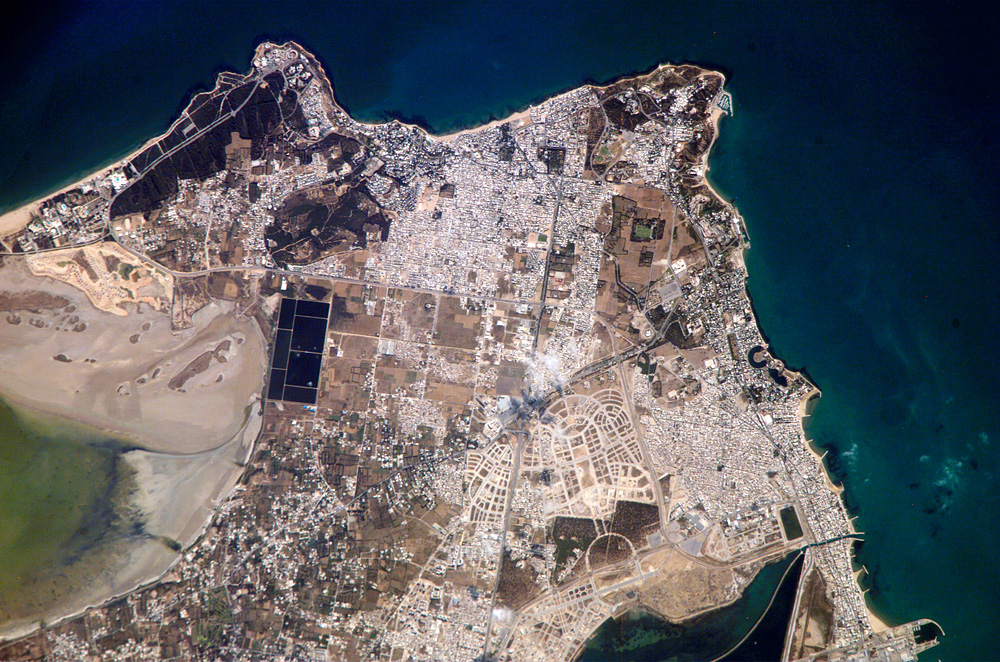
View of urban sprawl on Carthage.

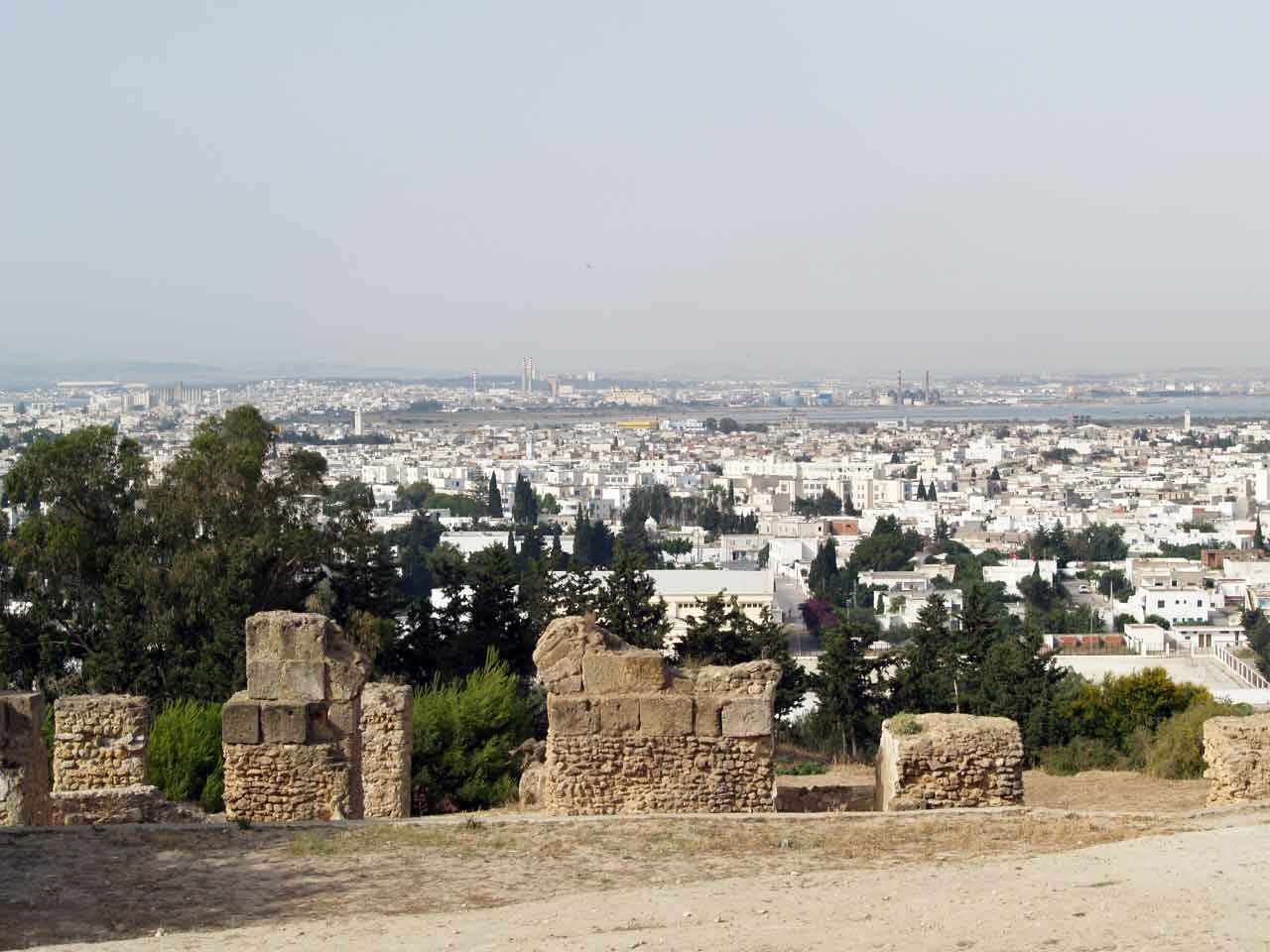
View of the urbanization of the site's environment.

The research carried out within the framework of the UNESCO mission, the establishment of site protection are not sufficient, even if they are necessary. Danger still looms, as declassification procedures have led to a reduction of the non-aedificandi zone and to constructions sometimes at the gates of the most emblematic places, including the area of the Punic ports. Similarly, the creation of the Mâlik ibn Anas Mosque could fuel controversy due to its location on the odeon hill.

However, urbanization is not the only threat weighing on the conservation of the site. The objects preserved in museums are not safe, as evidenced by the theft in November 2013 of the statuary group Statue of Ganymede, discovered in 1977 in the House of the Greek Charioteers, within its place of conservation, the Carthage Paleo-Christian Museum.

The preservation of the ruins is threatened by inadequate stabilization and maintenance, erosion, runoff, and pressures associated with tourism. Tunisian authorities have therefore faced the challenge in protecting the site while also promoting public awareness of its historical and archaeological significance. At the same time, Carthage's archaeological remains and historical importance contribute significantly to Tunisia's economy.

== Bibliography ==
- Amadasi Guzzo, Maria Giulia (2007). Carthage [Carthage] (in French). Paris: Presses universitaires de France. ISBN 978-2-13-053962-9.
- Bénichou-Safar, Hélène (1982). Les tombes puniques de Carthage: topographie, structures, inscriptions et rites funéraires (Thesis) (in French). Paris: Centre national de la recherche scientifique (CNRS).
- Beschaouch, Azedine (1993). La légende de Carthage [The legend of Carthage]. Découvertes Gallimard (in French). Paris: Gallimard. ISBN 978-2-070-53212-4.
- Cintas, Pierre (1976). Manuel d'archéologie punique. Collection des manuels d'archéologie et d'histoire de l'art (in French). Vol. II. Paris: A. et J. Picard. ISBN 2-7084-0003-7.
- Collective (1990). Carthage et son territoire dans l'Antiquité, IVe colloque international (tenu à Strasbourg du 5 au 9 avril 1988) [Carthage and its territory in Antiquity, 4th international colloquium (held in Strasbourg from April 5 to 9, 1988)] (in French). Paris: Comité des travaux historiques et scientifiques. ISBN 978-2-735-50201-1.
- Collective (1992). Pour sauver Carthage: exploration et conservation de la cité punique, romaine et byzantine [To save Carthage: exploration and conservation of the Punic, Roman, and Byzantine city] (in French). Paris/Tunis: Unesco/Institut national d'archéologie et d'art. ISBN 978-9-232-02782-5.
- Collective (1995). Carthage, l'histoire, sa trace et son écho: les Musées de la ville de Paris, Musée du Petit Palais, 9 mars-2 juillet 1995 [Carthage, history, its trace and its echo: the Museums of the city of Paris, Petit Palais Museum, March 9 - July 2, 1995] (in French). Paris: Association française d'action artistique. ISBN 978-2-879-00196-8.
- Decret, François (1977). Carthage ou l'empire de la mer [Carthage or the empire of the sea]. Points-Histoire (in French). Paris: Éditions du Seuil. ISBN 978-2-020-04712-8.
- Dridi, Hédi (2006). Carthage et le monde punique [Carthage and the Punic world] (in French). Paris: Les Belles Lettres. ISBN 978-2-251-41033-3.
- Ennabli, Abdelmajid; Rebourg, Alain (1993). Carthage: le site archéologique [Carthage: the archaeological site] (in French). Tunis: Cérès. ISBN 978-9-973-70083-4.
- Ennabli, Abdelmajid (2020). Carthage. « Les travaux et les jours »: recherches et découvertes, 1831-2016 [Carthage. "The works and the days": research and discoveries, 1831-2016] (in French). Paris: CNRS Éditions. ISBN 978-2-271-13115-7.
- Ennabli, Liliane (1997). Carthage, une métropole chrétienne du du IVe à la fin du VIIe (in French). Paris: Centre national de la recherche scientifique. ISBN 2-271-05402-8.
- Hassine Fantar, M'hamed (1998) [1993]. Carthage: approche d'une civilisation (in French). Tunis: Alif. ISBN 978-2-271-05028-1.
- Hassine Fantar, M'hamed (1995). Carthage la cité punique [Carthage the Punic city] (in French). Tunis: Cérès. ISBN 978-2-271-05191-2.
- Hassine Fantar, M'hamed (1993). Carthage: approche d'une civilisation [Carthage: approach to a civilization] (in French). Tunis: Alif. ISBN 978-2-271-05028-1.
- Hornby, Paulette (1995). "Auguste et la Nouvelle Rome" [Augustus and the New Rome]. Connaissance des Arts (in French) (69 (special issue)): 48–53. ISSN 0293-9274.
- Hours-Miédan, Madeleine (1982). Carthage [Carthage]. Que sais-je ? (in French). Paris: Presses universitaires de France. ISBN 978-2-130-37489-3.
- Hugoniot, Christophe (2000). Rome en Afrique: de la chute de Carthage aux débuts de la conquête arabe [Rome in Africa: from the fall of Carthage to the beginnings of the Arab conquest] (in French). Paris: Flammarion. ISBN 978-2-080-83003-6.
- Lancel, Serge (1999). Carthage [Carthage] (in French). Tunis: Cérès. ISBN 978-9-973-19420-6.
- Le Bohec, Yann (2005). Histoire de l'Afrique romaine (in French). Paris: Picard. ISBN 978-2-708-40751-0.
- Lézine, Alexandre (1969). Les thermes d'Antonin à Carthage [The Baths of Antoninus in Carthage] (in French). Tunis: Société tunisienne de diffusion.
- Lipinski, Edward, ed. (1992). Dictionnaire de la civilisation phénicienne et punique [Dictionary of Phoenician and Punic civilization] (in French). Turnhout: Brepols. ISBN 978-2-503-50033-1.
- Picard, Colette (1951). Carthage [Carthage] (in French). Paris: Les Belles Lettres.
- Slim, Hédi; Fauqué, Nicolas (2001). La Tunisie antique: de Hannibal à saint Augustin [Ancient Tunisia: from Hannibal to Saint Augustine] (in French). Paris: Mengès. ISBN 978-2-856-20421-4.
- Tlatli, Salah-Eddine (1978). La Carthage punique, étude urbaine: la ville, ses fonctions, son rayonnement (in French). Paris: Adrien-Maisonneuve.
- Yacoub, Mohamed (1995). Splendeurs des mosaïques de Tunisie [Splendors of the mosaics of Tunisia] (in French). Tunis: Agence nationale du patrimoine. ISBN 9973-917-23-5.
