= Baptistery of Bekalta =

Christian baptismal basin

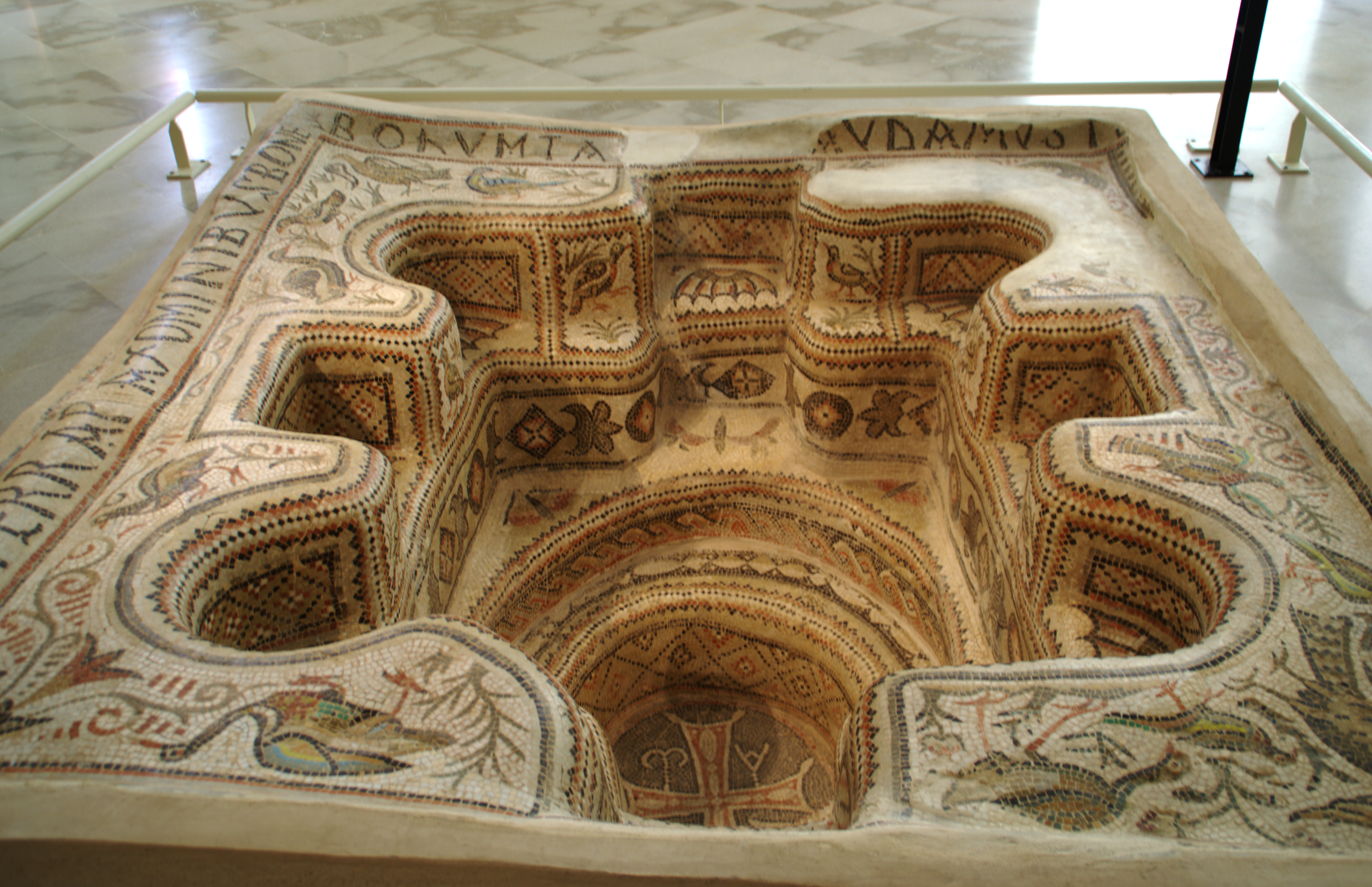
- Type: Baptistery
- Material: Mosaic
- Period/culture: 6th–7th century
- Discovered: Spring 1993; El Gaalla

The Baptistery of Bekalta, also known as the Baptistery of El Gaalla, is a 6th- or 7th-century Christian baptismal basin decorated with purple mosaics and noted for its state of preservation. It was discovered at the end of the 20th century near Bekalta, in Monastir Governorate, Tunisia.

The discovery of the baptistery occurred accidentally during land-leveling operations associated with a quarry that occupied the site of the archaeological remains. The quarrying activity damaged the structures of the religious complex to which the baptismal basin belonged. Accounts differ regarding the initial condition of the site before this disturbance; in any case, the complex could not be subjected to a comprehensive archaeological study.

The baptistery is now one of the principal works in the Sousse Archaeological Museum. Baptismal basins decorated with mosaics are considered rare among known archaeological remains. Its polylobed form, unusual in the context of religious architecture, is regarded as a distinctive feature.

== Location ==
The baptistery was discovered within the territory of El Gaalla, in the Monastir region, between Bekalta and Téboulba. It is located approximately two kilometers northwest of Thapsus (Note: Baratte et al. 2014, p. 227) (or southeast, according to Néjib Ben Lazreg and Noël Duval (Note: Collectif 1995, p. 304)) and south of Lamta, about three kilometers south of Henchir Sokrine, in the Tunisian Sahel, corresponding to the former Roman province of Byzacena.

The structure was uncovered on a hill situated approximately 300 meters from the sea, beneath a layer of about 20 centimeters of soil.

== History and discovery ==
=== Baptism in Antiquity ===
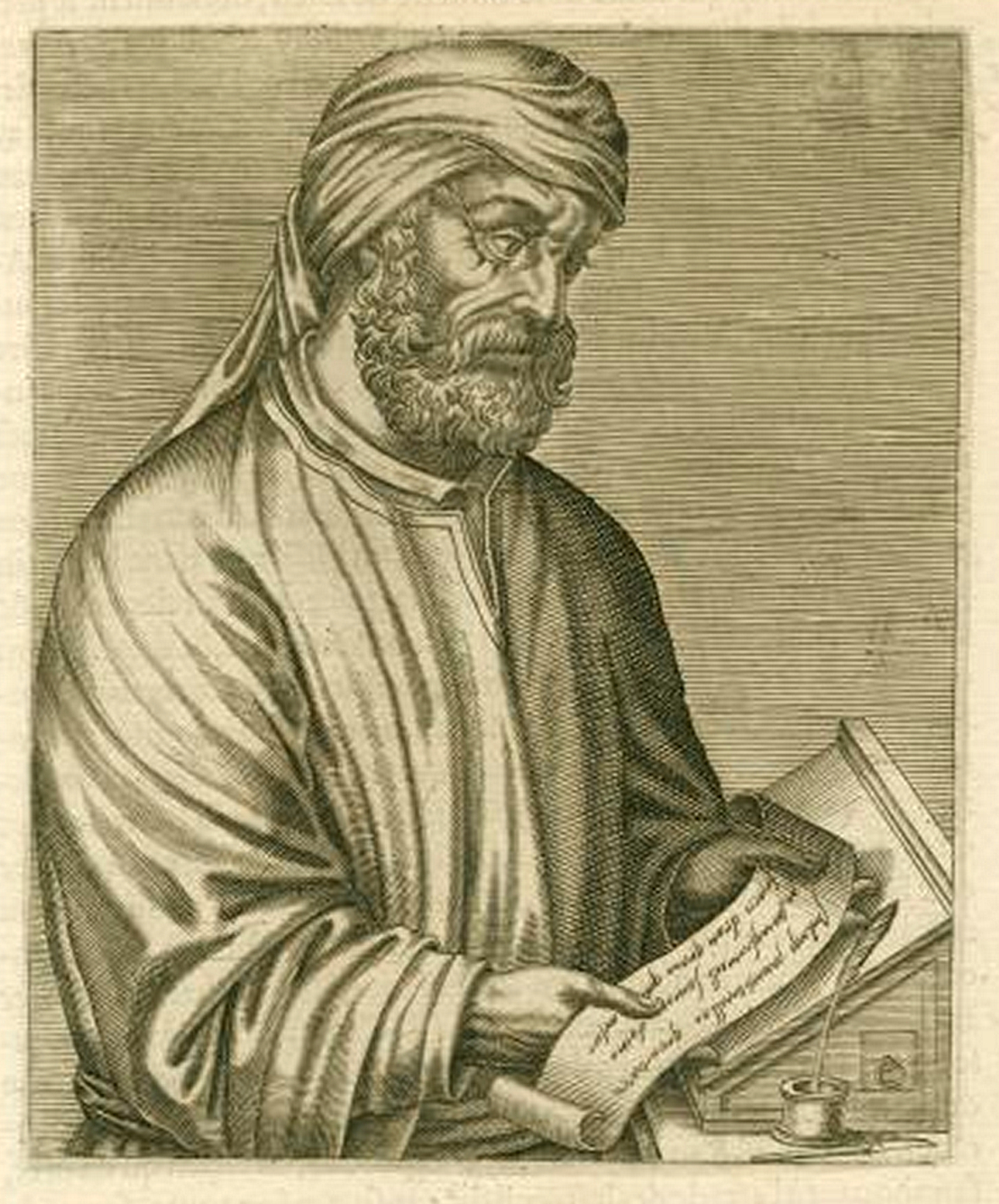
Allegorical portrait of Tertullian from André Thevet's Lives of Illustrious Men (Lyon, 1584).

The rite of baptism follows the accounts presented in the Gospels and is understood, according to the treatise De Baptismo by Tertullian, as conferring "deliverance from sin and eternal death." Tertullian's work, (Note: Briand-Ponsart & Hugoniot 2005, p. 261) regarded as one of the earliest descriptions of the rite in the Latin West, reflects a theological response to aspirations for eternal life that were also present in Roman Africa, as illustrated by the cult of Dionysus. For the Byzantine period, Erhard Schneider has noted what he describes as "a certain affinity" between the Christian ritual and practices referenced in 3rd-century literary sources.

The initiation process comprised two stages: the catechumenate and baptism itself. Tertullian expressed opposition to the baptism of very young children, arguing that the associated terminology and doctrinal formulation were not yet fixed. (Note: Corbier & Griesheimer 2005, p. 158)

The preparation of candidates for baptism began with an interview conducted by a religious authority, during which initial instruction was given in the principles of Christian life and in certain preparatory rites, including the laying on of hands, the renunciation of demons, and the consumption of blessed salt. This stage served both as doctrinal instruction and as a moral evaluation of the candidates, constituting a period of preparation for baptism. It was followed by more rigorous training and, ultimately, immersion in the baptistery. The candidate, referred to as a catechumen, was examined and required to undertake a period of penance.

The baptismal ceremony was commonly held on the eve of Easter, considered the most solemn occasion because of its association with Christ's Passion, thereby emphasizing the connection between the sacrament and the Resurrection of Jesus. The rite could also be celebrated on other occasions, particularly on the Lord's Day (Sunday).

The ceremony began with a vigil and was presided over by the local bishop. During the rite, the bishop blessed the baptismal water by invoking the Holy Spirit to impart sanctifying power. Baptism was understood as effecting the remission of sins. The pre-baptismal rites included the blessing of the water and the renunciation of Satan, the latter taking place before the baptismal basin. (Note: Corbier & Griesheimer 2005, p. 159)

The catechumen then entered the basin and faced the inscriptions incorporated into the mosaic decoration. Accompanied by the bishop, the candidate professed the faith through a spoken formula of belief, delivered in response to interrogative phrases—likely beginning with credis ("do you believe?")—referring to the Trinity. Each affirmation was associated with immersion in the basin. The rite was thus performed by immersion.

Following the baptism, additional rites were performed, including anointing, signing, and the laying on of hands. The ceremony concluded with the bishop anointing the baptized person with holy oil and marking a tau-shaped cross on the forehead while the individual's hands were crossed. The bishop also placed his hand on the head of the baptized person. After this, the individual was permitted to participate in Mass and receive Communion. The ceremony ended with a synaxis, during which participants broke the fast that had begun the previous day.

=== Ancient history ===
==== Summary ====
Maps of the provinces of Roman Africa after Diocletian's reform.

The region where the baptistery was discovered was historically influenced by Carthaginian civilization. At the beginning of the 4th century, the province of Africa was reorganized by Diocletian into three administrative units: Tripolitania, Byzacena, and Zeugitana, with Hadrumetum serving as the capital of Byzacena. The region, containing several significant cities, became an important area for the Christianization of North Africa, which accelerated during the 4th century. (Note: Briand-Ponsart & Hugoniot 2005, p. 377) During this period, African Christians were divided by the Donatist schism, associated with Donatus Magnus, (Note: Slim et al. 2003, p. 340) which primarily spread among rural populations known as circumcellions and represented a social opposition to large landowners, who were generally Catholic. (Note: Slim et al. 2003, pp. 343–344) Following the prohibition of pagan practices, conversions to Catholicism increased significantly after 399. (Note: Briand-Ponsart & Hugoniot 2005, pp. 415–416) The Conference of Carthage in 411 marked the decline of Donatism and the consolidation of Catholic authority. (Note: Slim et al. 2003, p. 439)

Pressure from neighboring peoples and the perceived wealth of the region attracted the Vandals, who crossed into North Africa in 429 (Note: Slim et al. 2003, pp. 349-350.) and captured Carthage in 439. In 442, the Western Roman Empire, under Emperor Valentinian III, formally recognized Vandal control over the region. (Note: Slim et al. 2003, pp. 352–353)

In the second half of the 4th century, the Vandals, like the Alans, adopted Arian Christianity, a doctrine previously condemned as heretical by the First Council of Nicaea. Some Vandal rulers, such as Genseric and Huneric, (Note: Slim et al. 2003, p. 373) implemented measures against non-Arian populations, including banishments, although the number of recognized martyrs is limited. (Note: Slim et al. 2003, p. 354) Other rulers, such as Gunthamund and Hilderic, allowed greater religious tolerance, while Thrasamund reintroduced restrictive measures. (Note: Slim et al. 2003, pp. 374–376) The Vandal authorities also confiscated lands from imperial estates and wealthy landowners, although this practice was not widespread in Byzacena. (Note: Slim et al. 2003, pp. 360–362) Over time, the Vandals assimilated aspects of Roman culture, (Note: Slim et al. 2003, pp. 358–360) and some converted to Catholicism despite the influence of the Arian clergy. (Note: Slim et al. 2003, p. 358)

The Vandal kingdom ended in 533 with the Byzantine reconquest under Belisarius. (Note: Slim et al. 2003, pp. 384–387) This reconquest did not restore the former Roman structures: indigenous kingdoms persisted, urban life declined, and rural society underwent processes of land concentration and medievalization. (Note: Slim et al. 2003, p. 387) The region experienced social unrest and economic difficulties in the mid-6th century. (Note: Slim et al. 2003, pp. 400–402) Byzacena saw a reduction in population and a decrease in the number of episcopal sees during this period, although conditions appear to have improved by the mid-7th century. (Note: Slim et al. 2003, pp. 404–405) The Byzantine presence also coincided with a period of continued Christian activity. (Note: Slim et al. 2003, pp. 405–406)

During the late 6th century, the region experienced renewed unrest, (Note: Slim et al. 2003, p. 412) including the reemergence of Donatism and theological disputes. (Note: Slim et al. 2003, pp. 417–418) It became part of the Exarchate of Carthage under Emperor Maurice and remained under Byzantine control until the Muslim conquest of the Maghreb. Following the Battle of Sufetula in 647, in which Byzantine forces were defeated, southern Byzacena faced repeated raids and was left largely without central control. The region continued to experience instability until the final fall of Carthage in 698, although the Arabs established Kairouan in 670. Berber groups resisted the Arab forces and temporarily regained control of parts of the region until 688. (Note: Slim et al. 2003, pp. 420–421)

==== History ====
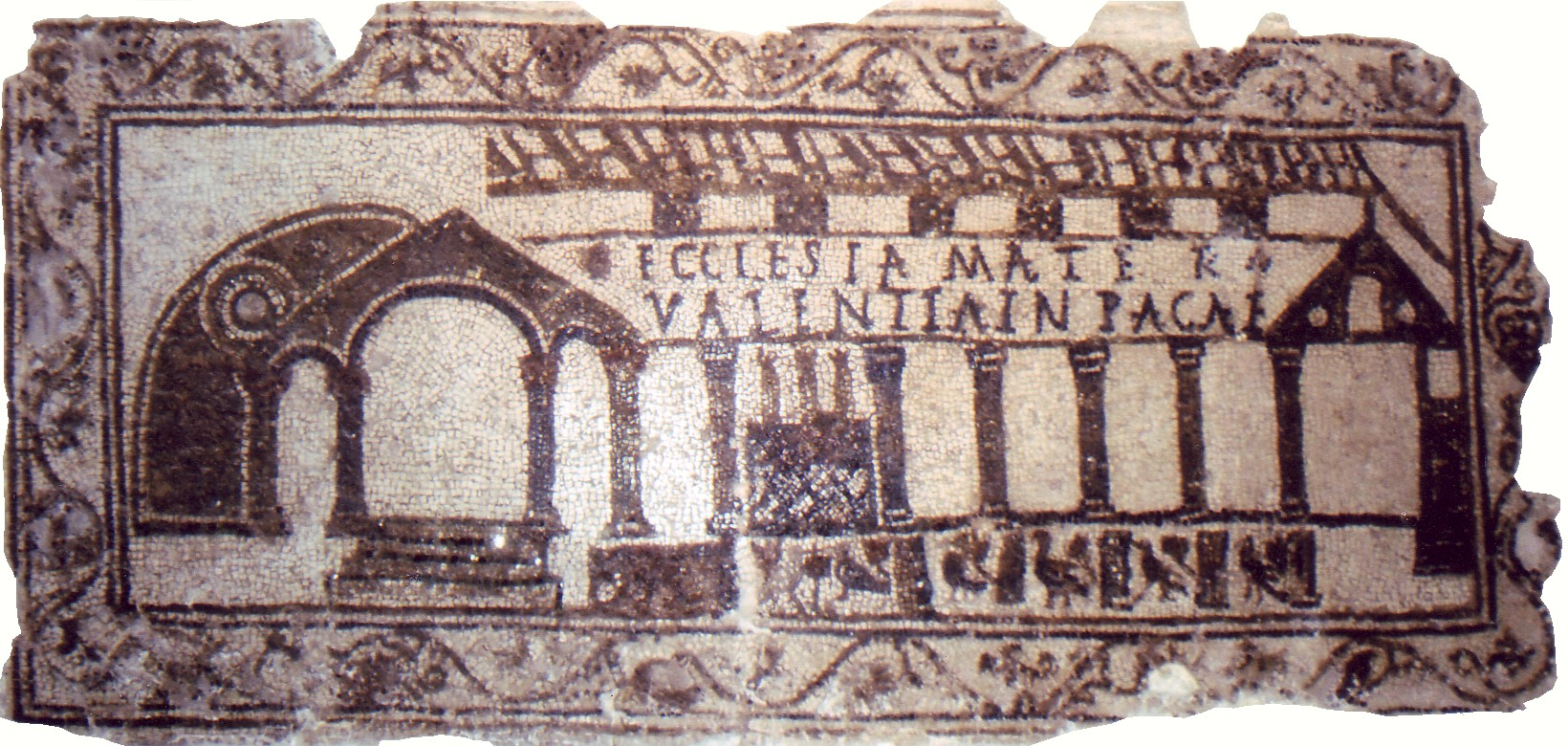
Mosaic from Ecclesia Mater, originating from Tabarka and preserved at the Bardo National Museum, depicting a basilica in cross-section dating from the 4th–5th centuries.

The archaeological site included a necropolis with a tomb dated to the Punic period. This Punic necropolis was located on a hill that was later affected by quarrying activity. In Late Antiquity, the area contained a bishopric, with three known bishops from the 5th–6th centuries. (Note: Collectif 1995, p. 307)

The baptistery was situated to the south of an early Christian basilica with three aisles. The basilica was oriented westward, while the baptistery, aligned on a west–east axis, was located in a room in the southern part of the building. At the time of its rediscovery, the three naves of the basilica were poorly preserved.

Three phases have been identified in the history of the baptistery, although only the final phase is well documented. Archaeological investigations revealed beneath the baptistery the remains of an earlier baptistery and drainage channels, as well as an additional baptistery to the west. The dating of the complex in its final phase remains uncertain. Some scholars, including Noël Duval, (Note: Collectif 1995, p. 305) date the basin to the 7th century, while Habib Ben Younès proposes a 6th-century date for the baptistery, with the broader Christian complex developing in the 5th–6th centuries. Excavations also uncovered an epitaph possibly bearing the name of a deacon, Dinamus. According to Erhard Schneider, the Christian building was constructed on land belonging to Dinamus, which had previously been the site of a Punic necropolis.

=== Recent rediscovery and archaeological research ===
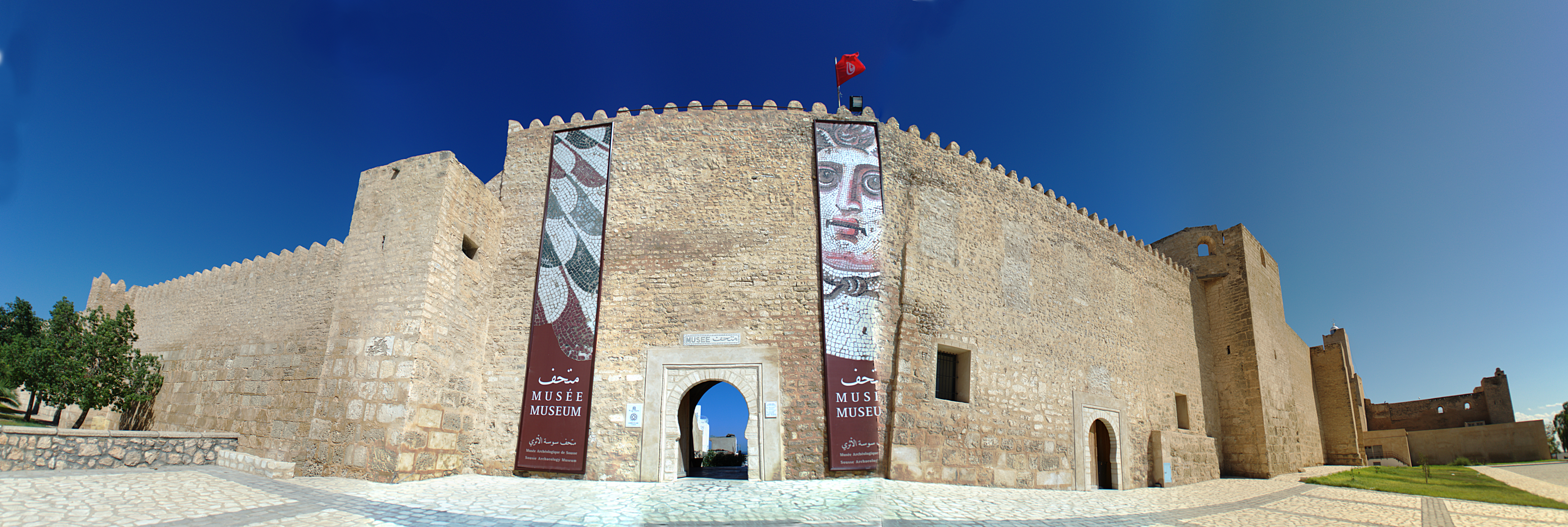
View of the outer wall of the Kasbah of Sousse with the entrance to the Archaeological Museum of Sousse, which houses the baptistery.

Since its discovery in the spring of 1993, the baptistery has been one of the major exhibits in the Sousse Archaeological Museum. The previous discovery of a comparably well-preserved baptistery—the baptistery of Kélibia, now held at the National Bardo Museum—dates to 1949.

The discovery resulted from work in a tuff quarry, opened to supply materials for the urbanization of the Tunisian coast. Buried beneath the surface, the baptistery was largely protected from construction machinery, which removed the rim and the mosaic of the room containing it. According to Erhard Schneider, the religious building had already been "heavily leveled […] well before the quarry was operated." The basilica, already in ruins, lost its central and left aisles during the quarrying, although "the baptismal room and the essential part of the basilica" remained intact prior to that period.

The El Gaala site was excavated in the summer of 1995, focusing on a pre-Roman kiln and several tombs belonging to a Punic necropolis. These excavations also identified several buildings surrounding the basilica. Three baptismal basins were uncovered: one to the south, with its drainage system preserved; another behind the apse; and a third, oriented on a west–east axis and polylobed, (Note: Baratte et al. 2014, p. 228) which is the piece currently on display.

The baptistery and associated mosaics, including the epitaphs, were transferred to the Sousse Archaeological Museum. It was featured as one of the prominent works in the Tunisian Season in France at the Petit Palais in Paris from March 9 to July 2, 1995, during the exhibition Carthage: Its History, Its Trace and Its Echo, which presented 250 archaeological works and related research on the city's influence in Western culture. In autumn 2020, the baptistery was selected to be reproduced in miniature for the "Museums for All" project, aimed at making museum collections accessible to visually impaired visitors.

== Description ==
=== General ===
The baptistery is a common feature of early Christian archaeological sites in present-day Tunisia, but it is notable for its exceptional state of preservation. In its preserved form, it measures 2.50 meters by 2.20 meters and has a depth of 1.43 meters (1.32 meters according to Erhard Schneider). The maximum preserved extent of the mosaic is 2.80 meters north–south and 2.37 meters east–west. (Note: Collectif 1995, p. 306) The baptistery was originally square, with a rim approximately 1.30 meters wide, leaving a central space measuring 4.77 meters on each side. The coping also measured 4.77 meters on each side.

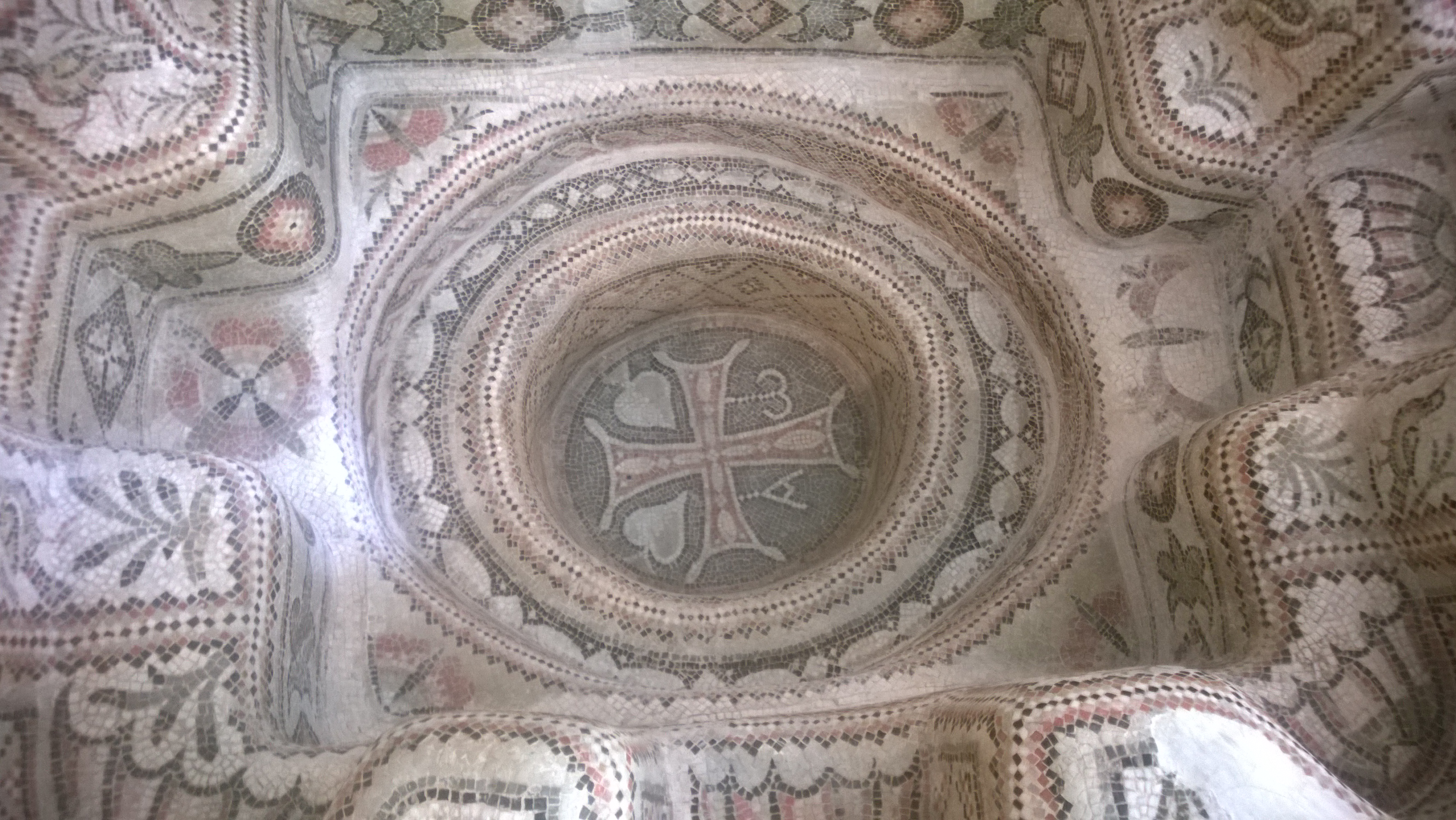
View from above the tank.

The basin itself measures 2.18 meters by 1.96 meters and has a depth of 1.35 meters. (Note: Baratte et al. 2014, pp. 227–228) It features a distinctive shape and is richly decorated with mosaics and other ornamental elements. The baptistery includes eight risers, four rectangular and four alveolus-shaped, with two steps leading to the bottom of the basin. One of the two lower levels at the base is circular. The rim is adorned with vegetal motifs, including acanthus scrolls, flowers, fruits, and birds, some of which are birds of prey. A cross accompanied by the Greek letters alpha and omega is depicted at the bottom of the basin.

The tesserae, approximately one centimeter in size, are composed of limestone in various colors (green, yellow, white, pink, and black), terracotta, marble, and glass. (Note: Collectif 1995, pp. 304–306)

=== Iconography and text ===
According to Habib Ben Younès, the baptistery is considered one of the most notable examples discovered in Tunisia.

==== Iconography ====
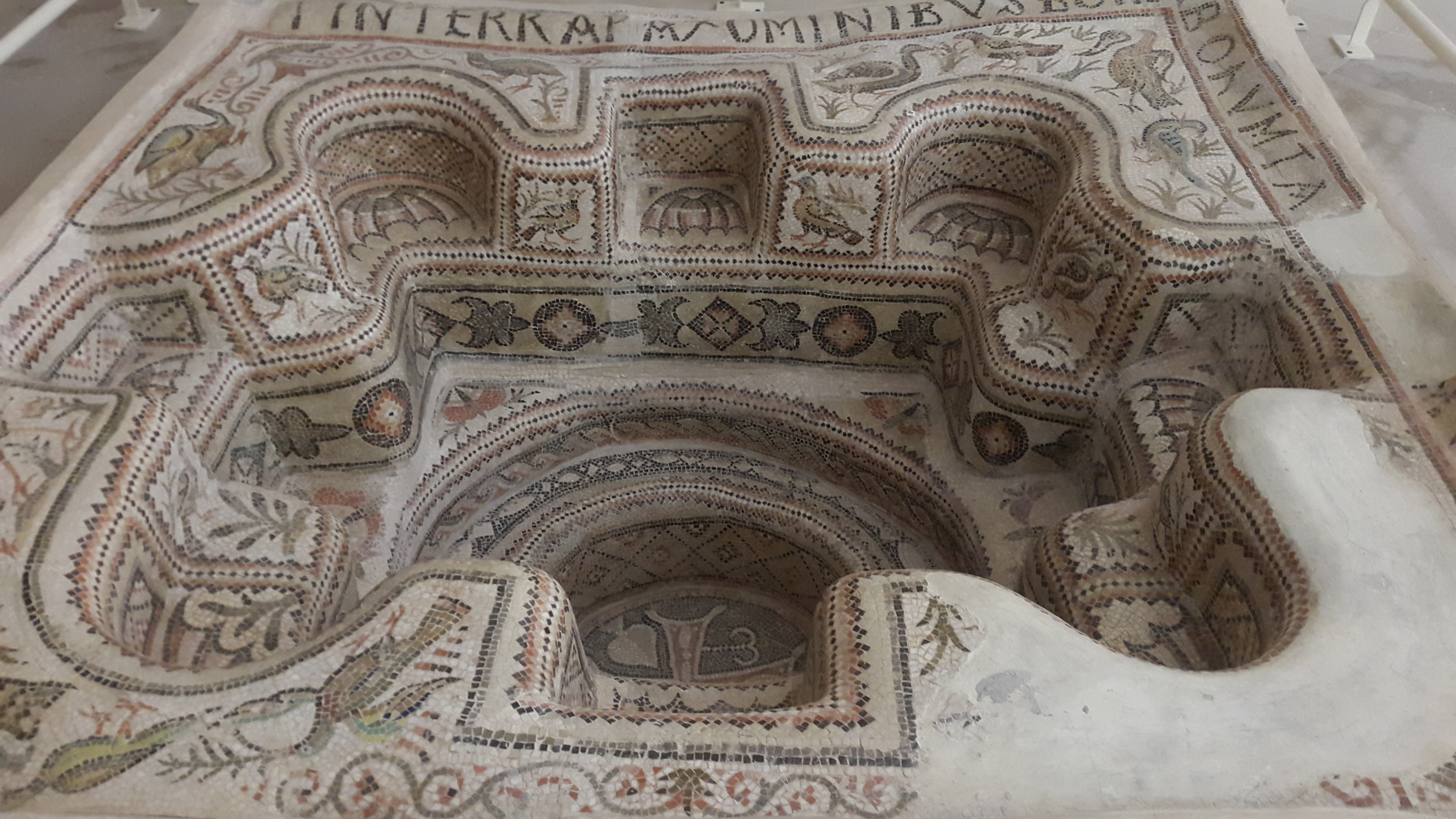
View of the baptistery with one side damaged by construction equipment and fragments of inscriptions.

The mosaics of the basilica at Bekalta display a decorative repertoire typical of the Byzantine period, incorporating geometric, vegetal, and avian motifs.

The baptistery includes two depictions of birds of prey with outstretched wings—interpreted as falcons or hawks—located in the northeast and southwest corners, accompanied by roses and palmettes. These birds are associated with solar symbolism and, in a Christian context, are considered to represent the triumph of Jesus over death and sin. In the southeast and northwest corners, floral motifs featuring two ducks are present, though their symbolic meaning is unclear.

The lower levels of the baptistery contain additional motifs. The risers are decorated with geometric patterns, including zigzags, and each inter-riser space features a bird interpreted as a dove, representing the Holy Spirit. The steps include a shell motif, a symbol of fertility, similar to one found in a baptistery at Hammam Lif.

The steps leading to the base of the basin are decorated with vegetal and geometric motifs. The step used to ascend from the basin features a rosette combined with a St. Andrew's cross motif, composed of olive leaves; (Note: Schneider 1995, p. 105) this motif appears only once. The penultimate levels above the basin floor include a variety of designs, including wave patterns, and when viewed from above, form a cross inscribed within a wreath. The basin walls display a reticulated pattern. The cross at the bottom of the basin is notable and, according to Erhard Schneider, draws inspiration from the cross erected at Golgotha by Theodosius in 420, which held significance within the Roman Empire. The cross incorporates the alpha and omega symbols. Its arms widen at the extremities, the background is red with a white outer border, and the center contains a pellet-ended cross motif. The lower portion of the cross displays the alpha and omega, while the upper section includes leaves with petioles.

==== Inscription ====
The baptistery contains a Latin inscription of the "salutation of the angels to the shepherds" (Luke 2:14), corresponding to the Gloria in excelsis Deo, located on the border. The inscription is well preserved on the south and west sides, while the east side has been reconstructed.

Inscription on the border
[g]loria [in excelsi]s deo et in terra pax ominibus bone bolumtatis laudamus te

English translation
Glory to God in the highest and peace on Earth to the men whom He loves. We praise you.

The lettering of the inscription is distinctive, particularly the forms of the letters A, X, and D, reflecting a "development of Latin compared to the classical period," including features such as phonetic renderings.

Two other inscriptions of the "angelic hymn" are known in Byzacena, for example at Uppenna. The phrase Laudamus Te, appearing at the end of the text, is similar to the formula Deo laudes, considered a characteristic Donatist acclamation. (Note: Schneider 1995, pp. 104–105)

== Interpretation ==
=== Iconography with profane and biblical origins ===
The Byzantine mosaics of Tunisia initially incorporated motifs of secular origin, which were reinterpreted in a religious context, and contributed to a corpus associated with the iconography of objects from the minor arts. The use of these motifs had liturgical significance. The decoration is interpreted symbolically in relation to the baptismal ceremony: the catechumen descended into the basin from the west, representing the "domain of darkness", and ascended from the east, representing the "domain of light".

The vegetal motifs and other decorative elements suggest a 6th-century date, with parallels to mosaics at the basilica of Dermech in Carthage, as well as sites at Sbeitla, Bulla Regia, Sabratha, and the Basilica of San Vitale in Ravenna. The depictions of birds of prey with outspread wings are linked to textual sources, such as Matthew 28:24 and Ambrose's De sacramentis IV, 7, symbolizing the transition of the newly baptized into the Christian faith.

There was also a transfer of motifs from pagan traditions into Christian contexts. The geometric patterns, which were widespread in regional mosaics, had an apotropaic function, serving as protection against the evil eye. This reflects a Christian reinterpretation of the local artistic heritage, in line with the teachings of Fulgentius of Ruspe, a prominent African theologian known for his writings against Vandal Arianism.

=== Original form and uncertain dating ===
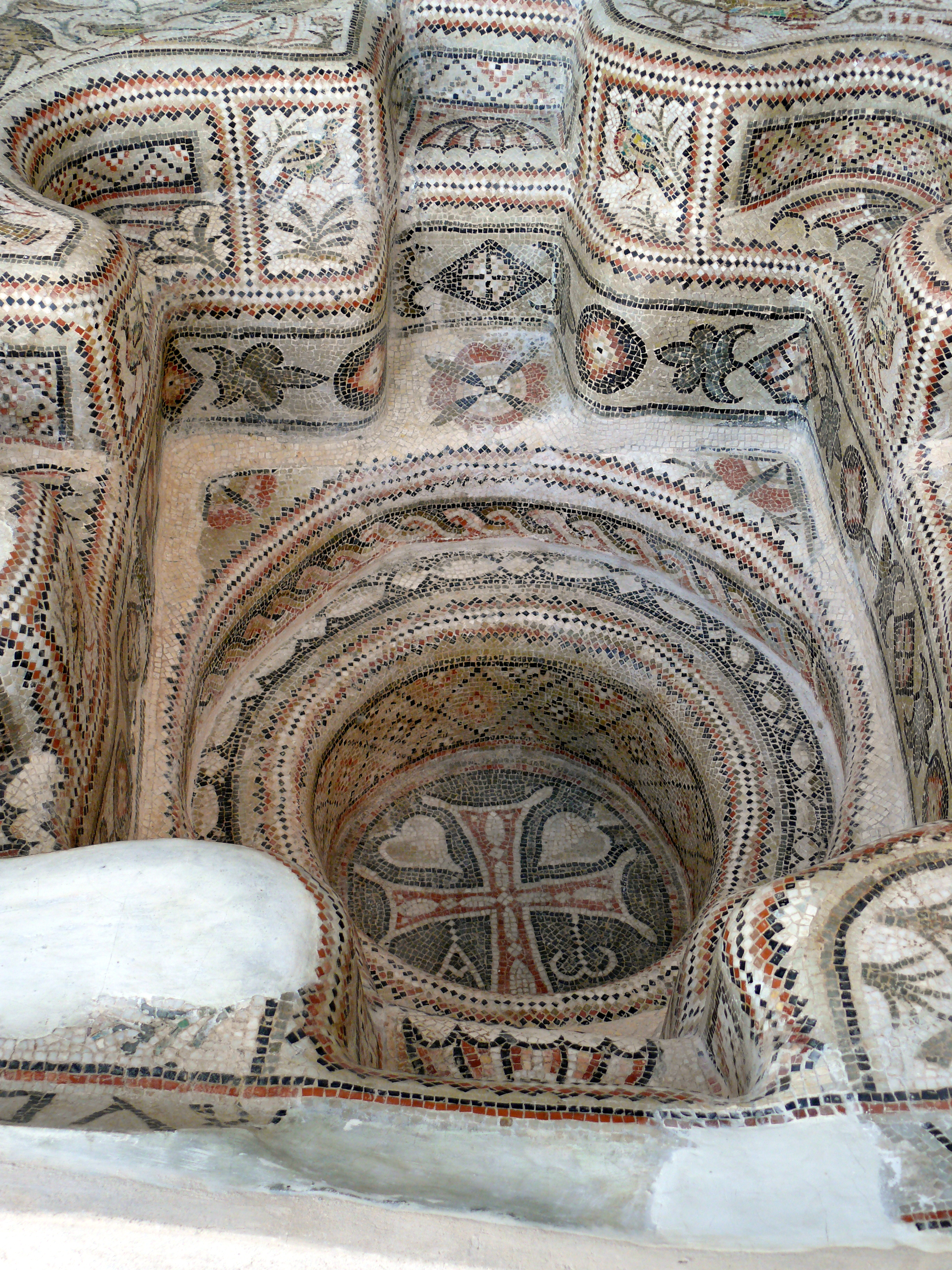
Aerial view of the baptismal font in a west-east direction, the presumed direction of movement of the catechumens.

The mosaic cross at the bottom of the basin, which originated in the 5th century, became widespread during the 6th and 7th centuries, from Syria to Ireland.

The design of the basin's steps has been interpreted, by Noël Duval and Néjib Ben Lazreg, as resembling the basins found in the atriums of wealthy Roman villas. Numbers such as 4, 6, or 8 may carry symbolic significance, according to Christian Courtois, with the eighth day representing Christ's circumcision and the Resurrection, referred to as a "spiritual circumcision". Paul Gauckler suggested that the basin's shape facilitated the simultaneous baptism of multiple individuals, while Silvio Gaston Moreno emphasized that its form may have been influenced by aesthetic considerations, with access likely designed for a particular circulation pattern.

The baptistery is believed to have been part of a church located on the estate of a landowner named Dinamus. The building is comparable to rural religious structures in the Tunisian Sahel that were equipped with baptisteries, with mosaics from one such site displayed at the archaeological museum of Lamta. Based on the archaeological context, Noël Duval supports a late 7th-century dating for the baptistery, while Habib Ben Younès and Silvio Gaston Moreno propose a 6th-century date.

=== Local testimony symbolic meaning ===
The motifs of the baptistery convey a coherent symbolic program emphasizing the universality of the Church, the concept of rebirth through baptism, and membership in the Christian community, ideas disseminated by Saint Augustine and Fulgentius of Ruspe. Some motifs also reflect earlier local spiritual traditions. The lozenge with a cross and a central circle, known in Byzacena, previously had an apotropaic function associated with the cult of Tanit and Baal Hammon and, in a Christian context, may symbolize the mercy of God as manifested in Jesus Christ. (Note: Schneider 1995, pp. 102–103)

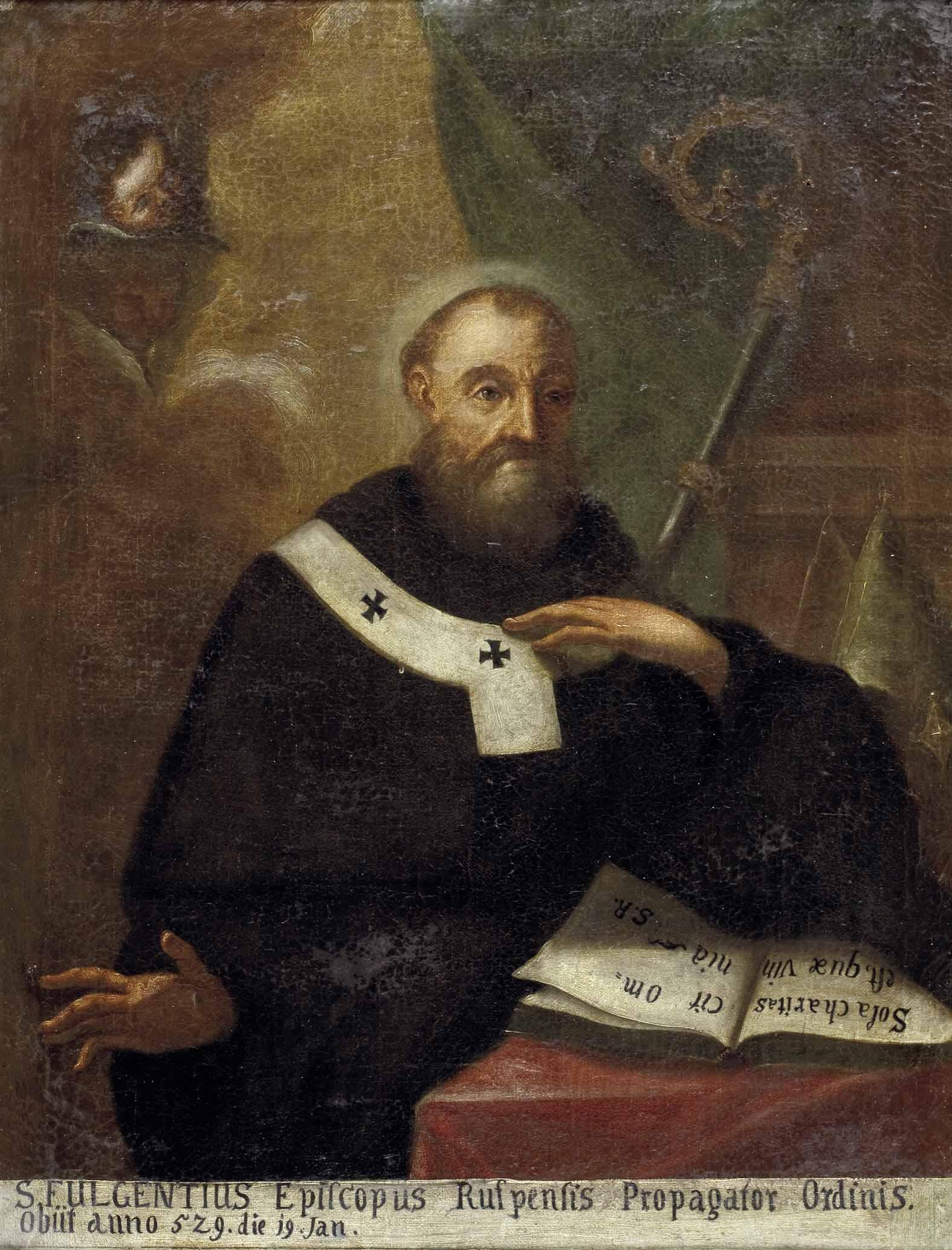
Anonymous portrait of Fulgence of Ruspe, who played a major role in doctrine. Inscription at the bottom of the anonymous painting: S. Fulgentius Episcopus Rufpensis Propagator Ordinis obiit anno 529 die 19. Jan.

The iconography of the baptistery incorporates numerous motifs with symbolic significance. The central symbol, emphasized through tesserae of different colors, originally represented the "center of the world" and was reinterpreted as a symbol of the one God and of Jesus Christ as universal Savior. The circle represents the Divinity overseeing creation. (Note: Schneider 1995, p. 100) A cross within a circle signifies the regenerating presence of God conferring spiritual renewal at baptism. Three concentric circles evoke the Trinitarian nature of God, in whose name the catechumen is baptized. (Note: Schneider 1995, pp. 100–101) The motifs in the basin also symbolize the water as imbued with the regenerating power of the Spirit, following interpretations associated with Saint Cyprian. (Note: Schneider 1995, p. 106) The alpha and omega linked to the cross refer to Revelation 22:13–14. The cross itself represents Jesus on the cross. At the same time, martyrdom is understood, according to Tertullian and Saint Cyprian, as a form of baptism granting direct access to Paradise, without awaiting the Resurrection. (Note: Schneider 1995, pp. 103–104) The crown on the first circular level reflects both the aspiration for martyrdom, viewed as the path to Paradise, and encouragement for perseverance. (Note: Schneider 1995, p. 104) Some motifs may reflect influence from Donatist liturgy, indicating that the local community later returned to Catholic practice. Square mosaics on the lower wall of the basin symbolize the gate of the Heavenly Jerusalem and a return to original perfection. (Note: Schneider 1995, pp. 101–102)

== See also ==
- Church of the Priest Felix and the Baptistery of Kélibia
- Baptismal font • Baptistery
- Mosaic
- Vandal Kingdom • Exarchate of Africa
- Late antiquity

== Bibliography ==
=== General works or articles not directly related to the archaeological site ===
- Arnauld, Dominique (2001). Histoire du christianisme en Afrique : les sept premiers siècles [History of Christianity in Africa: the first seven centuries] (in French). Paris: Karthala. ISBN 978-2845861909.
- Baratte, François; Béjaoui, Fathi; Duval, Noël; Berraho, Sarah; Gui, Isabelle; Jacquest, Hélène (2014). Basiliques chrétiennes d'Afrique du Nord [Christian basilicas of North Africa]. Inventaire des monuments de la Tunisie (in French). Bordeaux: Ausonius.
- Béjaoui, Fathi (1995). "Les grandes découvertes de l'Antiquité tardive" [The great discoveries of late antiquity]. Dossiers d'archéologie (in French) (200): 30–39. ISSN 1141-7137.
- Briand-Ponsart, Claude; Hugoniot, Christophe (2005). L'Afrique romaine : de l'Atlantique à la Tripolitaine (146 av. J.-C.-533 ap. J.-C.) [Roman Africa: from the Atlantic to Tripolitania (146 BC–533 AD)] (in French). Paris: Armand Colin. ISBN 978-2200260088.
- Cameron, Averil; Ward-Perkins, Bryan; Whitby, Michael (2000). The Cambridge Ancient History, vol. XIV : Late Antiquity: Empire and Successors, A.D. 425–600. Cambridge: Cambridge University Press. ISBN 978-0521325912.
- Corbier, Paul; Griesheimer, Marc (2005). L'Afrique romaine : 146 av. J.-C.-439 ap. J.-C [Roman Africa: 146 BC–439 AD] (in French). Paris: Ellipses. ISBN 978-2729824419.
- Duval, Noël (2003). "Un atelier de « mosaïques funéraires » à Acholla au IVe siècle (fouilles Fendri sous la direction de G. Picard en 1947-1954) [études d'archéologie chrétienne nord-africaine, XXXI]" [A workshop producing “funeral mosaics” in Acholla in the 4th century (Fendri excavations led by G. Picard in 1947-1954) [Studies in North African Christian Archaeology, XXXI]]. Mélanges de l'École française de Rome (in French). 115 (2): 755–777.
- Ghalia, Taher (2001). "La mosaïque byzantine en Tunisie" [Byzantine mosaics in Tunisia]. Dossiers d'archéologie (in French) (268): 66–77. ISSN 1141-7137.
- Lamare, Nicolas (2016). "Architecture et motif littéraire de la fontaine, Orient-Occident" [Architecture and literary motif of the fountain, East-West]. Parure monumentale et paysage dans la poésie épigraphique de l'Afrique romaine : recueil de carmina latina epigraphica [Monumental ornamentation and landscape in the epigraphic poetry of Roman Africa: collection of carmina latina epigraphica] (in French). Bordeaux: Ausonius. pp. 263–273.
- Modéran, Yves (2013). Les Maures et l'Afrique romaine (IVe – VIIe siècle) [The Moors and Roman Africa (4th–7th centuries)]. Bibliothèque des Écoles françaises d'Athènes et de Rome (in French). Rome: Publications de l'École française de Rome. doi:10.4000/books.efr.1395. ISBN 978-2-7283-1003-6.
- Piganiol, André (1964). Ve siècle, les événements : le sac de Rome [5th century, events: the sack of Rome]. Le Mémorial des Siècles (in French). Paris: Albin Michel.
- Slim, Hédi; Mahjoubi, Ammar; Belkhodja, Khaled; Ennabli, Abdelmajid (2003). Histoire générale de la Tunisie [General history of Tunisia] (in French). Vol. I: L'Antiquité. Paris: Maisonneuve et Larose. ISBN 978-2706816956.

=== Work on the site or on the baptistery ===
- Ben Younès, Habib (2002). "El Gaala, site périphérique de la ville de Thapsus (Ras Dimas) à l'époque préromaine : note préliminaire" [El Gaala, a site on the outskirts of the pre-Roman town of Thapsus (Ras Dimas): preliminary note]. Africa (in French). Tunis: Institut national du patrimoine. pp. 9–15.
- Schneider, Erhard (1995). "Le baptistère d'El-Gaalla" [The baptistery of El-Gaalla]. IBLA (in French). 58 (175): 85–106.
- Collectif (1995). Carthage : l'histoire, sa trace et son écho [Carthage: its history, its legacy, and its echo] (in French). Paris: Paris Musées. pp. 304–307. ISBN 9973-22-026-9.
