= Church of the Priest Felix and the Baptistery of Kélibia =

Baptistry form the early christianity

Coordinates: 36°48′33.2″N 10°8′2.8″E

Baptistry of Kélibia
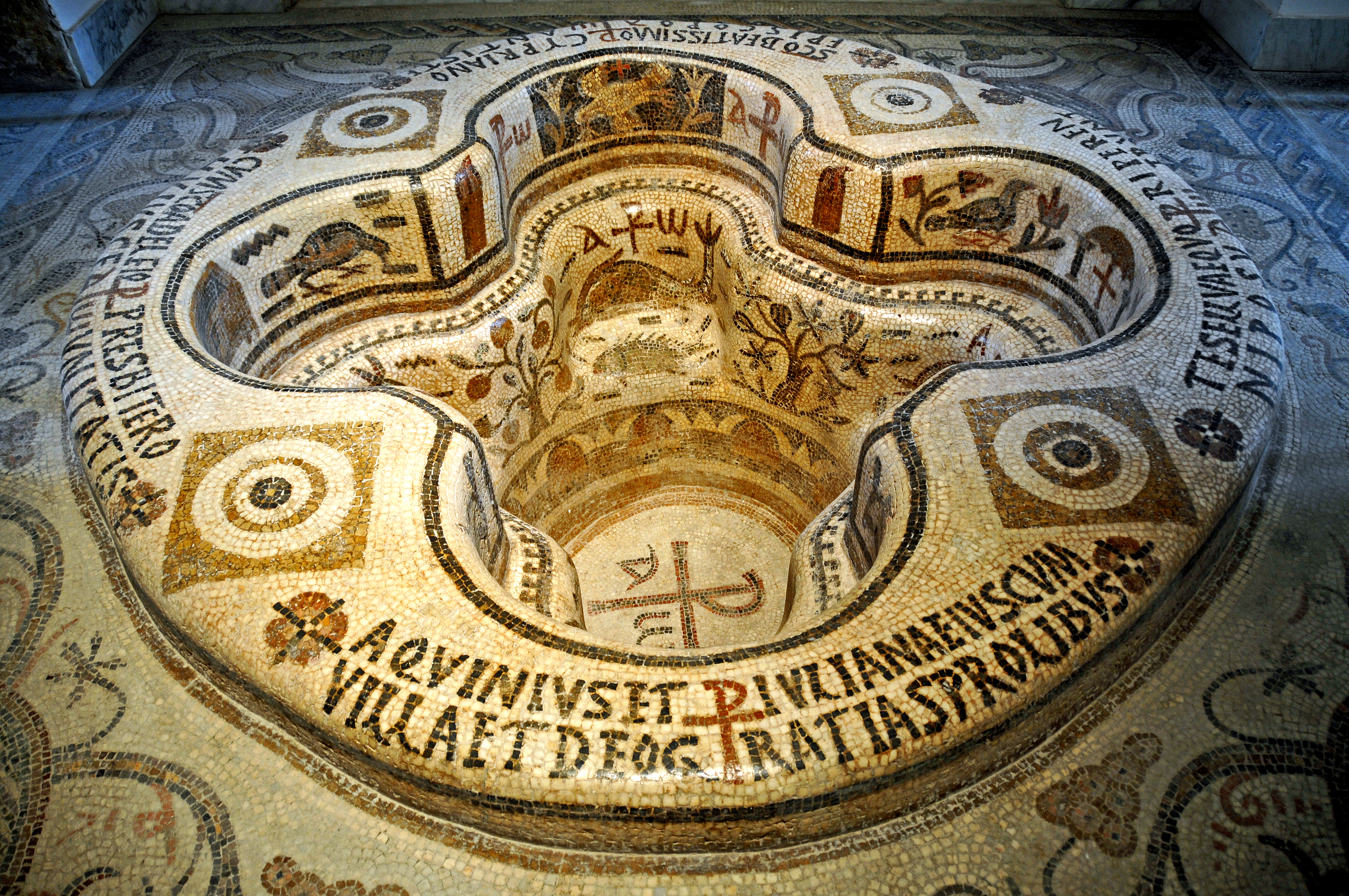
- Four-lobed baptismal font from Kélibia with its rich mosaic decoration and the texts that cover it.

Religion
- Affiliation: Early Christianity

Location
- Location: Musée national du Bardo, Tunis
- Interactive map of Baptistry of Kélibia

Specifications
- Length: 330 cm (130 in)
- Width: 330 cm (130 in)

The Church of the Priest Felix and the Baptistery of Kélibia, or the Baptistery of the Priest Felix of Demna, are a building and an Early Christian baptismal font richly decorated with mosaics. It was discovered in the 1950s at Demna, in the Hammam Ghezèze delegation in Tunisia.

The baptistery is a major piece in the Early Christian department of the Musée National du Bardo in Tunis, and represents, according to historian Christian Courtois, "one of the finest sets of Christian mosaics to have been found in Africa, and indeed, of its kind, in the entire Ancient Rome".

At the beginning of the 21st century, this archaeological find remains particularly important, despite the discovery of the later Bekalta baptistery in the early 1990s. Along with this emblematic piece, the Demna site also delivered a collection of funerary mosaics, studied in their archaeological context, which also joined the collections of the same museum.

== History and discovery ==
=== Location ===
Map of northeastern Tunisia with Cape Bon.

Since its discovery in October 1953 in the church of the priest Félix, in the locality of Demna, seven kilometers from Kélibia, the work has been one of the masterpieces of the Bardo Museum. As such, it joined the museum's collections in the very year of its discovery. After long being kept with other Early Christian pieces in the administration rooms of the Bardo Museum, and therefore inaccessible to the public, the baptistery is now visible thanks to the museum's major extension and renovation work.

=== History of excavation and research ===
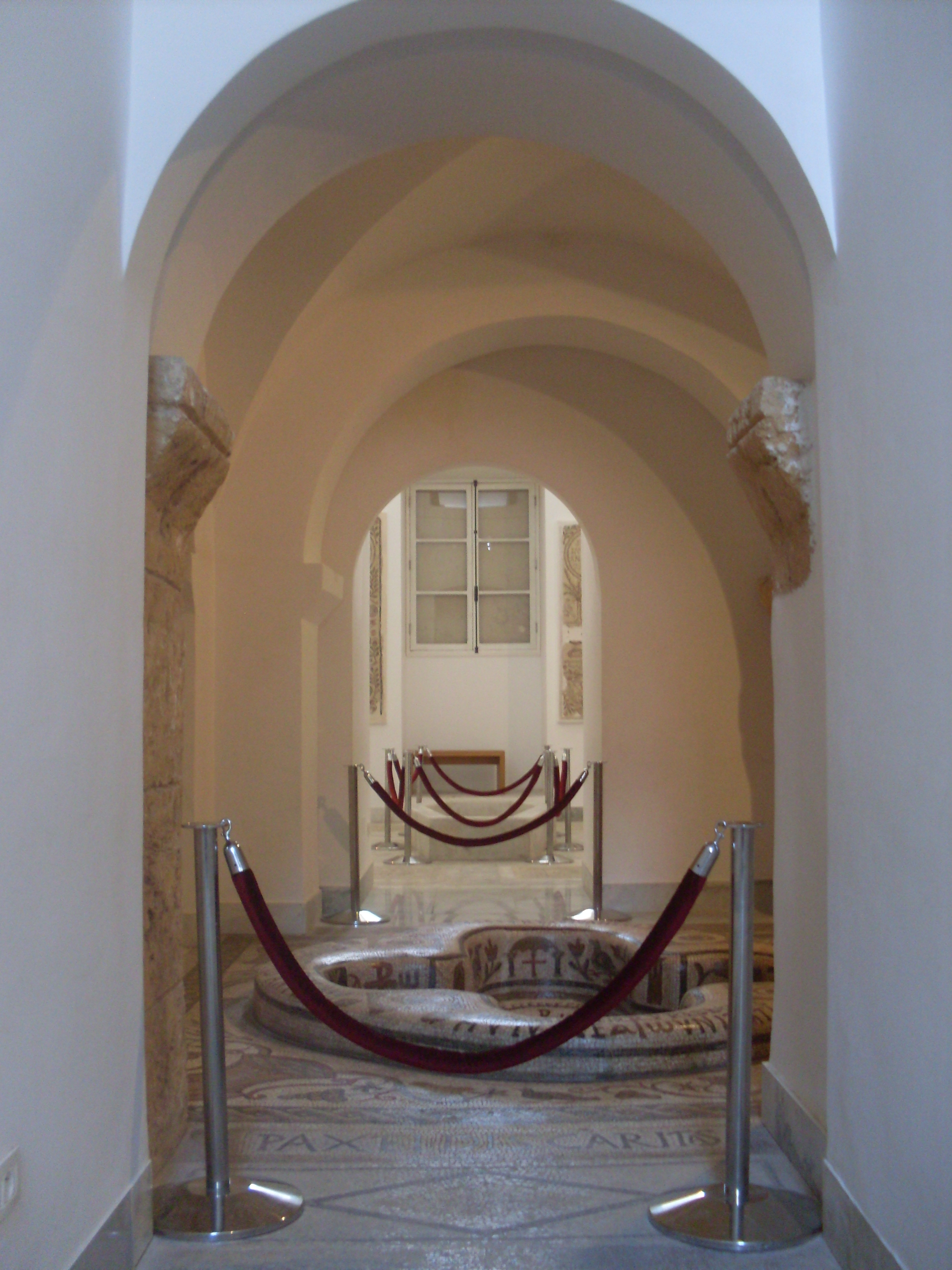
Baptistery in its current exhibition space, with the threshold and its inscription.

The site is described by the inventors as a forest dotted with archaeological remains located along the sea. Although the site has not been extensively excavated, a necropolis covering more than a hectare was reported by the diggers, and a Christian low relief, studied by Paul Gauckler, was discovered nearby in the early 20th century.

The baptistery was located in the ruins of a basilica, in the southwest corner of the building, during work carried out in October 1953. Jean Cintas, an engineer, and archaeologist, excavated the church in the summer of 1955 with the help of staff from the Antiquities Department, the Forestry Administration and solidarity workers. However, the excavations remained incomplete on the façade of the building and in the courtyard. Initial excavations yielded a few objects that cannot be precisely dated, including a crater, ceramic fragments, and marble objects. They enable us to study a corpus of Christian mosaics in their archaeological context, unlike the Tabarka mosaics, which are also preserved at the Bardo and have not been studied in their context. However, the tombs were not explored, and the necropolis was subsequently looted. Christian Courtois studied it the following year, followed by Noël Duval and finally Taher Ghalia in the 1990s. The latter excavations shed light on the building's history and layout, even though Duval notes the rapid deterioration of the ruin.

The baptistery was transported to the Bardo Museum before exhaustive excavations of the church took place in 1955. The transfer of the baptistery to the museum in 1953 posed major logistical problems due to its fragility. The site also contains several tumulus mosaics, which have been studied in their archaeological context. The most recent tombs are of masonry construction.

== Archaeological context: the church of the priest Felix ==
=== A brief history of a modest church on Cap Bon ===
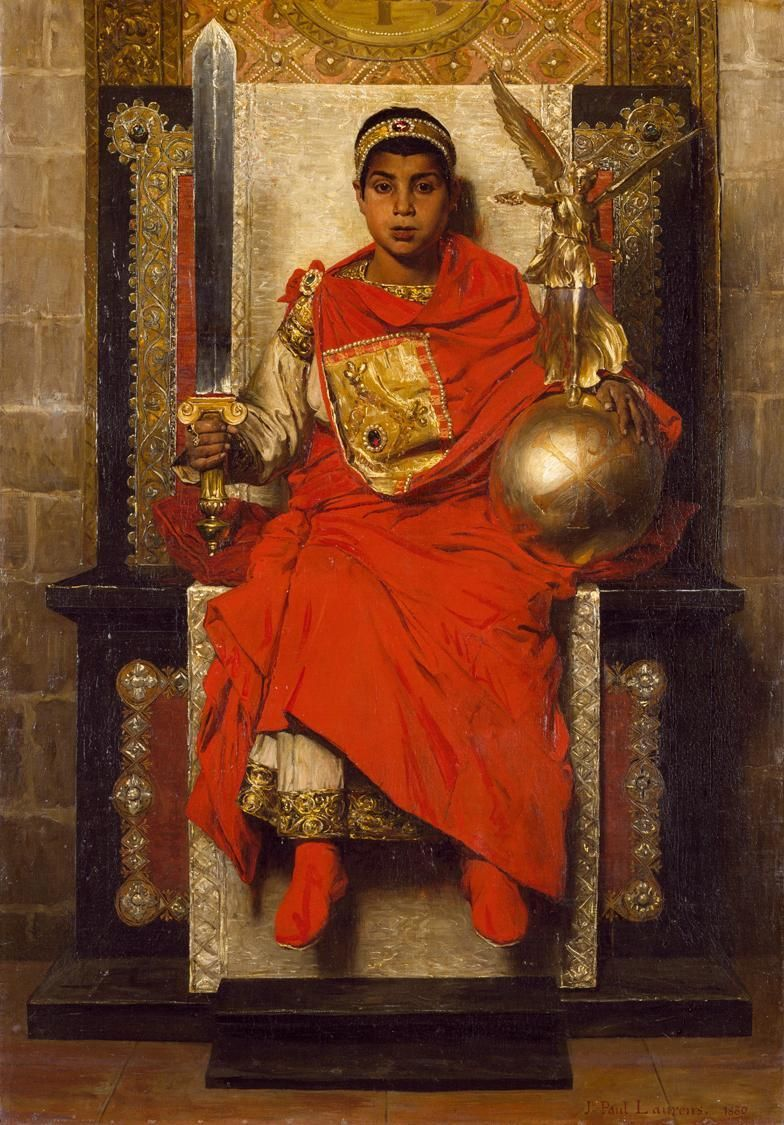
The Late Empire: Honorius, painting by Jean-Paul Laurens, Chrysler Museum of Art, Norfolk.

The simultaneous discovery of another baptistery, more crudely built and containing a monetary treasure dated to the reign of Flavius Honorius, enabled the excavators to date the first basilica to the 4th century. The initial abandonment of the building is estimated at the beginning of the 5th century, and its supposed final state corresponds to the time of the Byzantine reconquest. Duval estimates that the building was abandoned at the end of the 5th or beginning of the 6th century, and that the treasure is the product of hoarding. Nine of the 43 coins have been cleaned, and the uncleaned lot may contain Vandal coins.

Jean Cintas notes three stages in the church's history: the first, completed in the late 4th or early 5th century, followed by the construction of chapels and a new baptistery, and ending with work on the right-side aisle and apse in the early 7th century.

Noël Duval considers the church, baptistery, and atrium to date from the 4th century. In the late 4th and 5th centuries, a period of prosperity for the local community, the building became a cemetery church ad sanctos, with funerary mosaics dating from before the 6th century. Apsidal chapels were gradually built along the aisles to house the graves of privileged families, giving the architectural ensemble a martyrium-like appearance. The church was quickly "invaded" by tombs (as the excavators put it), as the building was located outside the town and was therefore not subject to the ban on burials in towns. The chancel is destroyed. The tombs are either decorated with mosaics or have none. The dead were buried not far from their relics, as in Carthage, where the basilica of Damous El Karita included "rooms for funerary use".

Successive states of the church of the priest Félix

At the end of the 5th or beginning of the 6th century, contemporary with the reign of the Vandals, the apse was destroyed. The baptistery may have been destroyed at the same time. The apse was raised and an arcosolium added. The building was restored after these predations, and the baptistery was rebuilt in the 6th century, while the south sacristy was destroyed. Architectural choices may have been dictated by changes in liturgical orders or by financial considerations. Columns reused from earlier buildings were added alongside the pillars. The plan was then modified: the apse was reduced, and the presbytery was extended into the quadratum populi by a platform supporting the wooden altar, which contained two sarcophagi. In Tabarka, in a similar situation, Paul Gauckler evokes a martyr's tomb, but here perhaps it's only a question of the tombs of privileged people. The baptistery was rebuilt in the second half of the 6th century under Byzantine influence on a new plan and covered with a dome resting on pillars; this work was "an important innovation in a church whose architecture had previously been so mediocre". There is a difference between the relatively simple restoration work on the apse, and the work on the baptistery, which required substantial financial resources from a donor.

However, the church was impoverished in the second half of the 7th century. The church was again partially restored at the end of the Byzantine era or at the beginning of the Arab occupation (7th–8th centuries), with the floor raised. These works were carried out after heavy destruction "too serious to be repaired", and only a small part of the old building, the former north aisle, was used, along with the chapels on this side. The shrinking of churches is a well-known fact in North Africa, dating back to the 7th century; the Christian community declined but may have persisted after the Arab conquest.

The building was not destroyed suddenly, and the materials were then recovered.

=== General description ===
The church, which fits into the fabric of local buildings, is perpendicular to the sea. The initial plan of the building does not stand out from other African basilicas and has a "banal appearance".

The edifice is small, even at its largest extension, with maximum proportions of 24 × 12 m; the means devoted to it were limited and the population few, despite the lack of knowledge we have of the neighboring ancient agglomeration. Constructed in small-scale brickwork, the building features large-scale stonework on the corners. The walls are made of mortar and earth and coated with plaster. The pillars are made of local sandstone. The floor, initially of rammed earth, was later fitted with funerary mosaics in the apse and naves. In front of the building is a courtyard with tombs and banqueting facilities, as well as a building originally thought to be a tower but identified in recent excavations as a small room. The building was covered by a wooden and tiled frame with two slopes, and its height is unknown. The state of the courtyard makes a precise study difficult.

The church has three naves and seven bays. A semicircular apse is located on the chevet side, and a chancel closes the last four bays. The apse has a raised floor, and two sacristies were originally present, possibly vaulted. The sacristies do not have a classical plan, as one wall is curved. According to Noël Duval, the apse rooms on either side of the basilica are funerary chapels with access to the side aisles. The altar left no trace, as it may have been made of wood; a funerary mosaic, no. 28 of a man named Rusticus, was built on its probable site.

A second baptismal room was built on the south side of the apse, with an oval-shaped basin 0.51 m in diameter and 0.93 m deep. This element was considered by the inventors of the site to be "the primitive baptistery". According to Taher Ghalia's excavations, the primitive basin is in one of the pillars of the ciborium of the four-lobed basin and measures 1.30 meters by 1.40 meters.

=== Funerary remains ===
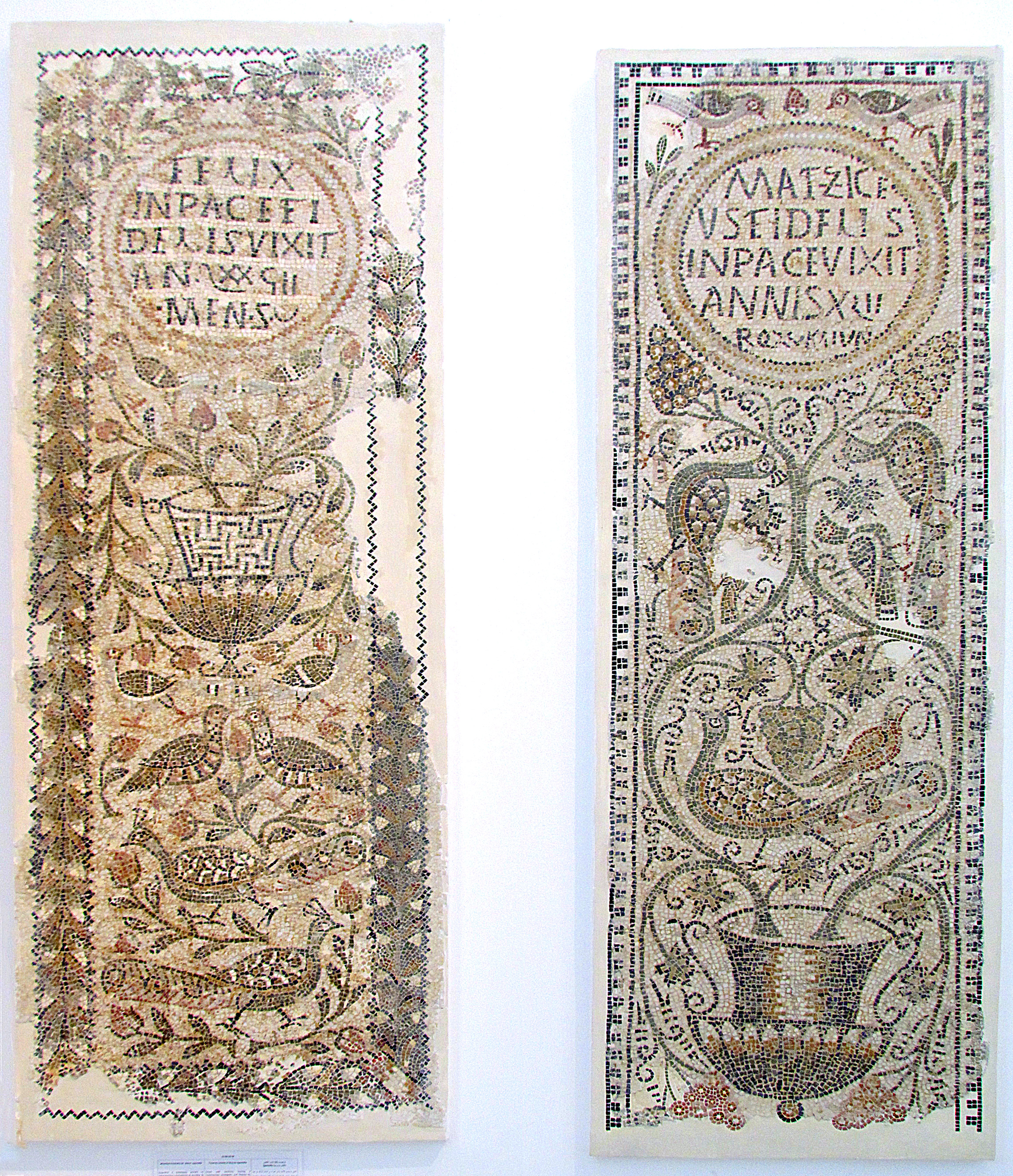
Early Christian funerary mosaics from the Church of the Priest Felix in the Bardo Museum. The one on the left is excavator's no. 16 and the one on the right is no. 17, mentioned by Duval.

Graves in funerary mosaics and sometimes in masonry have been dated to the 4th and 5th centuries, and these discoveries are an indication of the "funerary character of the building"s. The reasons for the construction of caisson tombs are not well known; a lack of space was cited at Tabarka, but this argument cannot be accepted for the Kélibia edifice.

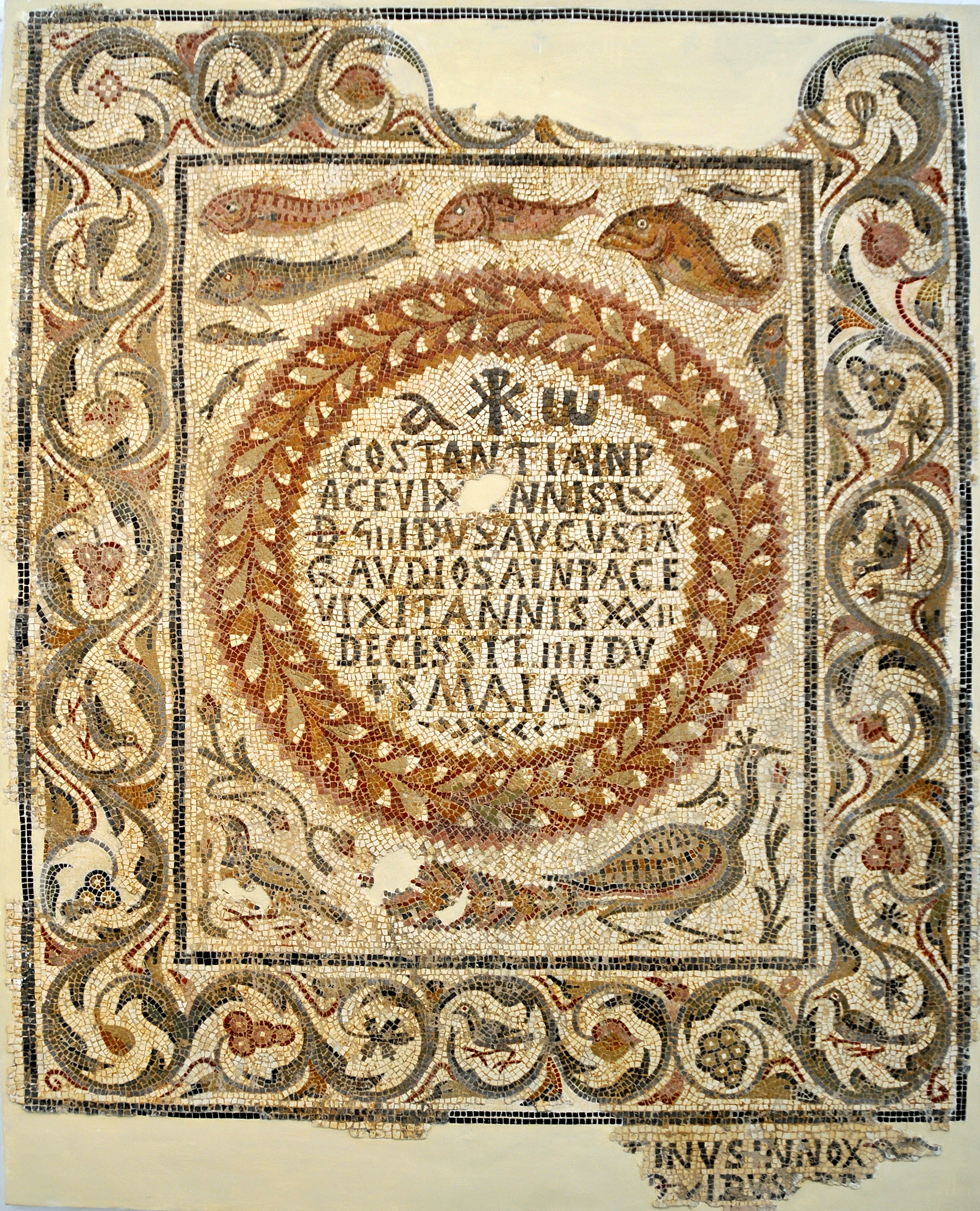
Early Christian funerary mosaic from the church of the priest Felix, no. 36 by the site's excavators.

Four priests, two deacons and a reader have been identified among those buried in the church (apse and choir). Twenty percent of the deceased are over 80 years of age. The burials involved 37 men and 17 women. The excavator found that the women were buried in the right-side aisle. The fifty funerary mosaics feature a small number of motifs, a dozen or so representing Christian symbols, the most frequent being birds and roses. The motifs are very commonplace, and the repertoire is homogeneous.

The epitaphs are brief, banal and of "apparent uniformity". An onomastic study was carried out, highlighting rare names, some of Berber origin. A study of epithets enabled us to examine fashion phenomena. The epitaphs are very homogeneous and date from the end of the 4th century to the beginning of the 6th century, with Duval pointing out that the absence of any systematic excavation of the burials causes inaccuracy in dating. Most of the work on the funerary mosaics had to be carried out in the workshop, so as not to interfere too much with the progress of the worship ceremonies, unlike in Tabarka, where the mosaics were composed in situ. The tomb of the priest Felix found in the apse, which bears no. 1 in the corpus studied, is the oldest, dating from the end of the 4th century. Clerics were buried either in the apse or in the choir, the latter also accommodating privileged individuals. These funerary mosaics, an "essentially popular art", predate the 6th-century baptistery. According to Cintas, the abandonment of funerary mosaics was due to impoverishment, even though mosaicists continued to work on the site, and recent tombs are devoid of epigraphs.

== Description of the 6th-century baptistery ==
=== General description ===
The baptistery is located to the south-west of the basilica, in a kind of kiosk independent of the basilica to which its northern corner was connected. According to Francis Salet, it is an "autonomous edifice" bounded by four pillars. The baptistery was rebuilt at a time of great upheaval for the basilica, and the architect used walls, adapting his plan to them. The complex of baptistery and kiosk constitutes "an important innovation in this church, hitherto so banal in plan and so poor in structure", even if the form is not original.

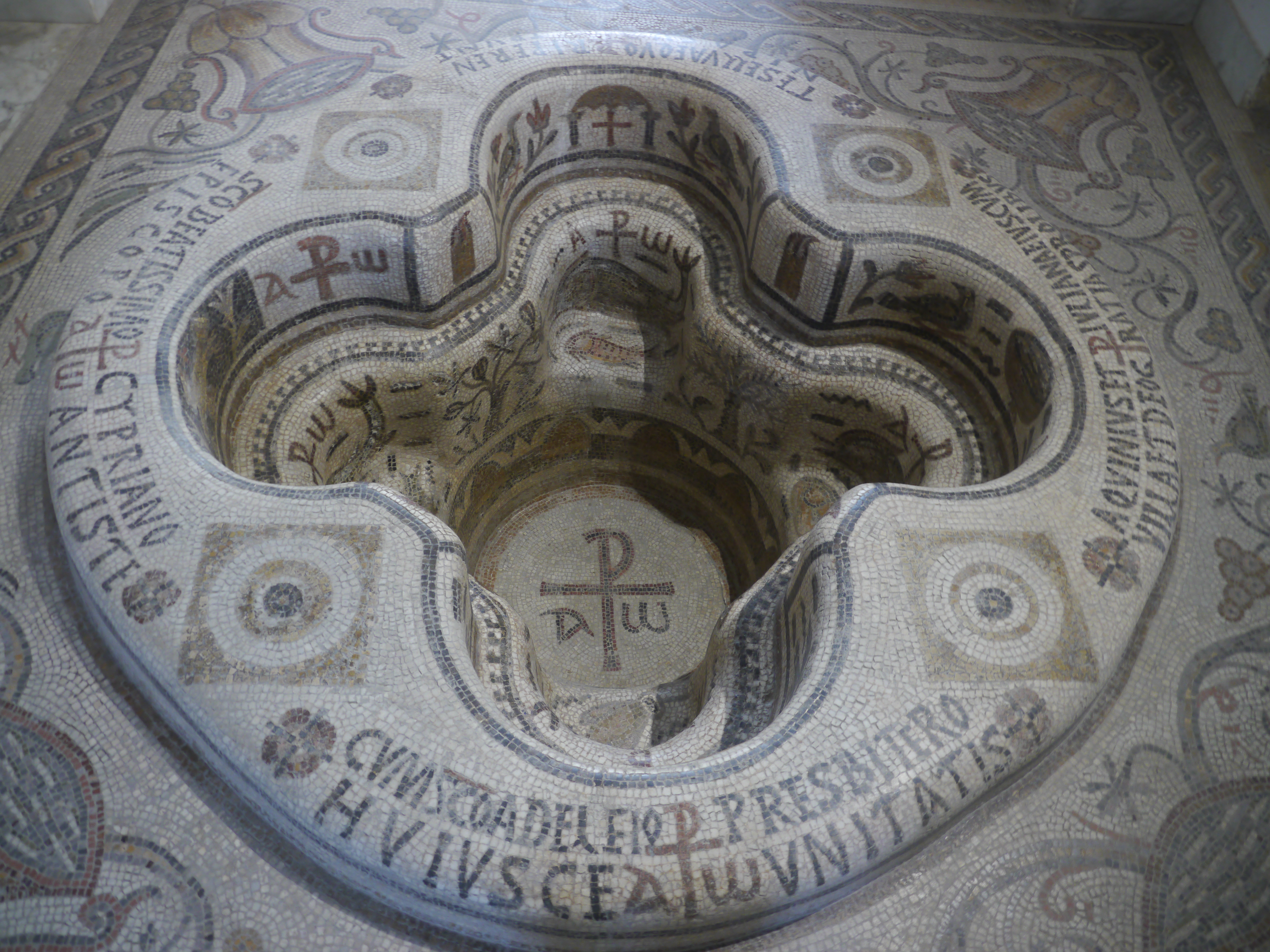
View of the baptistery.

The baptistery is a tetrapylon, a square measuring 3.30 meters on each side. The 2.10-meter-diameter vat is set about ten centimeters off the ground and stands on a square mosaic pavement, decorated at the corners with four cantharus or craters from which scrolls, or vine branches emerge. The circular basin is integrated into a quatrefoil. The cover of the kiosk is unknown, but perhaps a dome was present, as evidenced by the size of the pillars and the importance of the domes built during the reign of Emperor Justinian. The baptistery has an ambulatory; this model was most common in the East in the 6th century, and the baldachin dome is appropriate for a Byzantine building.

The pavement features a threshold on which is inscribed: Pax fides caritas (Peace, faith, charity). This is undoubtedly the entrance to the building, and the orientation of the Chrism at the bottom of the baptismal basin, and hence the arrangement of the various participants in the ceremonies.

The basin, shaped like a Greek cross, has a four-lobed basin, each arm of which has a step for descending. The basin is approximately two meters deep. A ciborium, in the form of a four-meter baldachin on pillars, protected the whole. The baptismal basin is shaped like a mensa, to "materialize [the] symbiotic relationship between the Eucharist and baptism" and is also reminiscent of the cross.

=== Mosaic basin ===
The entire mosaic, "one of the most beautiful mosaic ensembles in Christian Africa", is set against a yellow background. The mosaics in the baptistery are the most recent in the building, dating from the reign of Emperor Justinian or later.

The vat contains the only inscriptions in the church that are not funerary. On the threshold are the words Pax fides caritas. The entire rim is decorated with two lines of text, with the bases of the columns represented in cross-section; this text is problematic because of the names of the people quoted: "In honor of the holy and blessed bishop Cyprian, head of our Catholic church, together with the holy Adelphius, priest of this church of unity, Aquinius and Juliana his wife and their children Villa and Deogratias have laid this mosaic destined for eternal water"; the dedicators and dedicatees are thus named. A Chrism marks each cell of the basin, with the alpha and omega.

The polychrome interior is richly decorated with "a very concerted symbolic program": dove with white and yellow feathers carrying an olive branch, cup of milk and honey, crate, baldachin housing the cross, dolphins supporting a chrism, image of Christ, fish, candles, trees, and flowers including lilies. Christian Courtois also notes bees, Noah's Ark, a chalice, and a ciborium. The trees are highly stylized and can be identified as a fig tree, a palm tree, and an olive tree; the last is either an apple tree or an orange tree, according to Mohamed Yacoub. The identification of bees was called into question in 1984 by Paul-Albert Février, who based his study on the marine iconography present on the mosaics preserved in the Bardo Museum and considered that they were representations of cephalopods in general and cuttlefish in particular. The decoration of the tank is reminiscent of the marine and campaign scenes that sometimes coexist on African mosaics. Monogrammatic crosses with alpha and omega punctuate the various representations.

Mohamed Yacoub considers that "the technical execution of the work is rather mediocre", the overall effect given being linked to the contrasts in color. The mosaics in the baptistery have similarities with certain type II mosaic tombs (the most recent) "both in terms of iconography [...] and stylistic particularities".

== Interpretation of the baptistery ==
In 1961, Noël Duval described the baptistery as "the most beautiful monument of its kind discovered to date in Africa".

=== Rich mystical symbols and borrowings from secular tradition ===
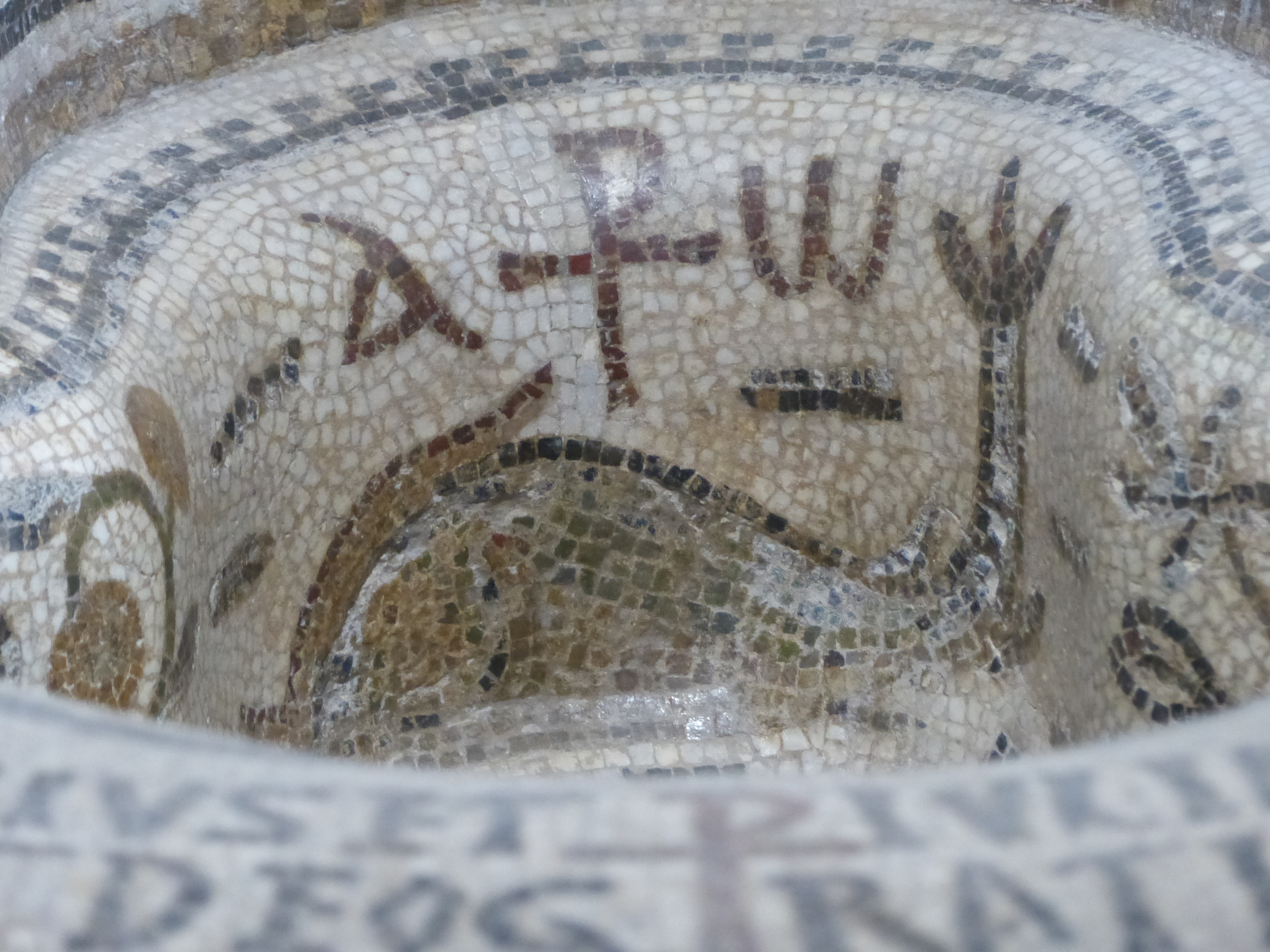
Details of the baptismal font.

In his book, Christian Courtois describes the layout of the figures: after crossing at the threshold, the catechesis finds the bishop on his left. The divine message is placed in his direction, and he can then access the knowledge of the Christianity and receive the chalice of milk and honey traditionally offered to the newly baptized.

To make the message comprehensible to the catechumens, the décor is "rich in mystical symbols": The dove with the olive branch heralds the believer's peace, Noah's ark testifies to the unity and durability of the Church, and the baldachin symbolizes the victory of Christianity, the cup heralds communion, the candles symbolize faith and Christ, the fish symbolize souls, the trees evoke the Garden of Eden and the dolphin symbolizes Christ saving the shipwrecked fishermen.

The baptistery at Hammam Lif also featured a marine animal decoration in the basin.

The symbolic value is strong, testifying to the triumph of Christ and the cross, as well as to the Paradise promised to the faithful. However, Paul-Albert Février considers that, in the specific case of water, there are more borrowings "from profane tradition than from Christian symbolism" and, more generally, a "close link [...] between the profane world and the decoration of places of worship".

=== Testimony to the circumstances of African Christianity ===
Noah's Ark, a symbol of the unity of the Church, can bear witness to the circumstances in which the work was created, particularly the struggles between Donatists and Catholics. In fact, Donatism persisted in Africa until the Arab conquest, and flourished again in the second half of the 6th century. By donating the work, the donors testified to their attachment to Catholic orthodoxy.

Courtois dismisses the identification of the Cyprian mentioned in the text with Saint Cyprian, as he believes it to be the local priest. Février, on the other hand, believes that Cyprian is the local bishop and Adelphius the minister. Yacoub, following in the footsteps of Cintas and Duval, believes that Cyprian is the preeminent prelate in Africa, while Adelphius, the bishop of Thevestis, is described as a priest, probably to affirm the preponderance of the martyred bishop. According to Duval, the dedication of a baptistery to a saint other than John the Baptist is rare, and the inscription leaves "a certain margin of uncertainty". Duval refers to St. Cyprian, the Catholic church mentioned as the "church of unity" and the Peace linked to the period of conflict during the Donatist schism of the second half of the 6th century. Cintas, for his part, puts forward the hypothesis of a second Thevestia.

== Bibliography ==
- Baratte, François; Béjaoui, Fathi; Duval, Noël; Berraho, Sarah; Gui, Hélène; Jacquest, Isabell (2014). Basiliques chrétiennes d'Afrique du Nord. Bordeaux: Ausonius.
- Abed-Ben Khedher, Aïcha Ben (1992). Le musée du Bardo : une visite guidée. Tunis: Cérès. ISBN 9789973700834.
- Duval, Noël (1972). "Études d'architecture chrétienne nord-africaine". Mélanges de l'École française de Rome: Antiquité: 1071–1172. ISSN 0223-5102.
- Fantar, M'hamed Hassine; Aounallah, Samir; Daoulatli, Abdelaziz (2015). Le Bardo, la grande histoire de la Tunisie : musée, sites et monuments. Tunis: Alif. ISBN 9789938958119.
- Ghalia, Taher . (2003). "L'architecture religieuse en Tunisie aux Ve et VIe siècles". Antiquité tardive (10): 213–222. ISSN 1250-7334.
- Slim, Hédi; Mahjoubi, Ammar; Belkhodja, Khaled; Ennabli, Abdelmajid (2003). Histoire générale de la Tunisie. Maisonneuve et Larose. ISBN 9782706816956.
- Slim, Hédi; Fauqué, Nicolas (2001). La Tunisie antique : de Hannibal à saint Augustin. Paris: Mengès. ISBN 9782856204214.
- Yacoub, Mohamed (1993). Le musée du Bardo : départements antiques. Tunis: Agence nationale du patrimoine. ISBN 9789973917126.
- Yacoub, Mohamed (1995). Splendeurs des mosaïques de Tunisie. Tunis: Agence nationale du patrimoine. ISBN 9973917235.
- Cintas, Jean; Duval, Noël (1961). "À propos d'une église récemment fouillée près de Kelibia et de ses mosaïques funéraires". Bulletin de la Société nationale des antiquaires de France: 55–62. ISSN 1153-2548.
- Cintas, Jean; Duval, Noël (1958). "L'église du prêtre Félix (région de Kélibia". Karthago (9). ISSN 0453-3429.
- Courtois, Christian (1956). "Baptistère découvert au Cap Bon". CRAI. 100 (2): 138–143.
- Courtois, Christian (1955). "Sur un baptistère découvert dans la région de Kélibia". Karthago. 6: 98–127. ISSN 0453-3429.
- Février, Paul-Albert (1984). "L'abeille et la seiche (À propos du décor du baptistère de Kélibia)". Rivista di Archeologia Cristiana. 60: 277–292. ISSN 0035-6042.
- Février, Paul-Albert; Poinssot, Claude (1959). "Les cierges et l'abeille, notes sur l'iconographie du baptistère découvert dans la région de Kélibia (Tunisie)". Cahiers archéologiques. 10: 0067–8309.
- Palazzo, Éric. "Iconographie et liturgie". La mosaïque du baptistère de Kélibia (Tunisie). 34: 102–120. ISSN 0066-6386.
- Salet, Francis (1957). "Un baptistère découvert au Cap Bon en Tunisie". Bulletin monumental. 115 (4): 283–284. ISSN 0007-473X.

== See also ==
- Vandal Kingdom
- Late antiquity
- Baptistery
- Baptismal font
- Mosaic
- Baptistery of Bekalta
