= Basilica of Dermech I =

Early Christian basilica in Carthage, Tunisia

Dermech Basilica I
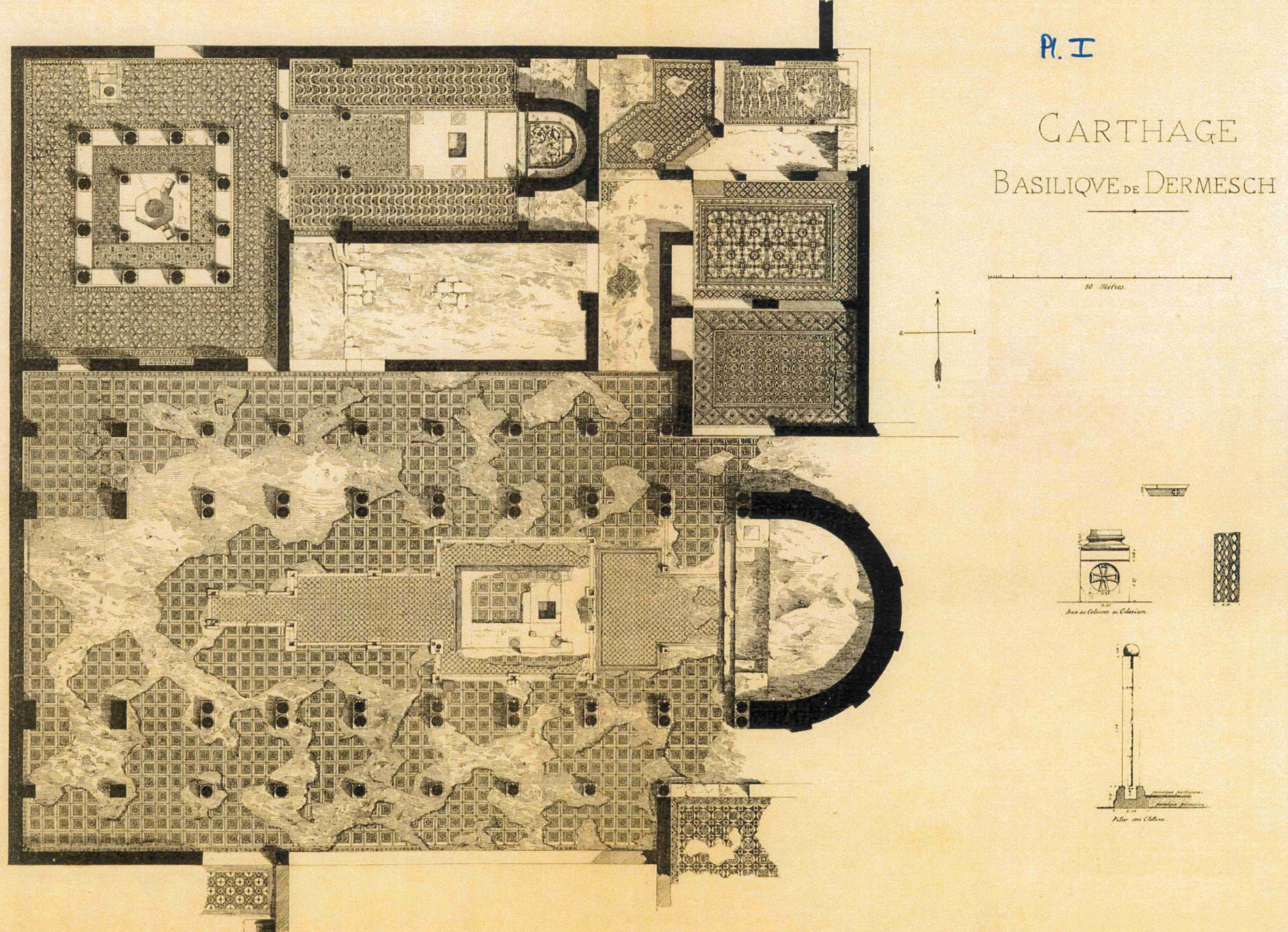
- The Dermech Basilica as drawn by Sadoux in Gauckler's work

Location
- Location: Carthage
- Country: Tunisia
- Interactive map of Dermech Basilica I
- Coordinates: 36.85502°N 10.33219°E

The Dermech Basilica, later called Dermech Basilica I, is an early Christian building located in the archaeological park of the Baths of Antoninus in the Archaeological Site of Carthage, Tunisia. By the beginning of the 2000s, specialists considered it one of the best-preserved churches in Carthage.

== Location and name ==
General plan of the archaeological site of Carthage.

Plan of the remains within the archaeological park.

The basilica is located in the archaeological park of the Baths of Antoninus, less than 100 metres (330 ft) (150 metres (490 ft) according to Baratte et al.) (Note: Pascal Vipard, 2006, p. 29.) from the bath complex and the shoreline, and also near the Bordj Djedid cisterns. (Note: Gauckler, 1913, p. 11.) It lies south of the site of the Monastery of Saint Stephen, which was destroyed following excavations carried out at the beginning of the 20th century.

The basilica is now designated Dermech Basilica I to distinguish it from two other buildings discovered within the enclosure of the archaeological park of the Baths of Antoninus, Dermech Basilica II and Dermech Basilica III. The buildings have also been referred to as the Douimès basilicas, after a local term meaning "vaults". The building is oriented east-northeast to west-southwest. (Note: Picard, 1951, p. 49.)

To the north and west of the building is a Christian cemetery, (Note: Ennabli, 2000, p. 50.) where Paul Gauckler discovered more than one hundred graves. (Note: Gauckler, 1913, p. 12.)

== History ==
=== Ancient history ===
The building was unknown before its discovery and is not mentioned in any surviving ancient sources. It occupies an area that had previously been used as a Punic necropolis until the 5th century BC. The site was not reused until the construction of the basilicas. According to Gauckler, the buildings cannot predate the end of the Vandal occupation or the reign of Justinian I, a dating supported by their construction techniques and decorative features. (Note: Gauckler, 1913, p. 16.)

More recent studies of the mosaics identify four phases in the building's history between the end of the 4th century and the middle of the 6th century. (Note: Baratte et al., 2014, p. 114.) The chancel underwent at least two construction phases, (Note: Ennabli, 2000, p. 48.) and Gauckler uncovered traces of earlier floors, (Note: Gauckler, 1913, p. 13.) the earliest of which contained pottery dating to the 5th century. No burials or epitaphs were discovered during the archaeological excavations.

According to Gauckler, the first phase of the building dates from the Vandal occupation, while the second belongs to the Byzantine period, around 523–525. During a final phase, a baptistery was constructed after the destruction of one of the apses, in the late Byzantine period. Concrete floors were installed shortly before the site was abandoned. (Note: Baratte et al., 2014, p. 118.)

The building was destroyed by fire. (Note: Gauckler, 1913, p. 14.) Gauckler attributed its destruction to the Arab conquest of 698. According to the excavator, sculptures decorated with religious motifs were deliberately destroyed, and he also identified evidence of a large bonfire built in the middle of the structure using all the furniture and combustible materials. (Note: Gauckler, 1913, p. 17.) During the Middle Ages, the ruins were quarried for stone by sailors from Pisa or the Venice, and the ruins gradually became buried beneath the hill.

=== Modern history and rediscovery ===
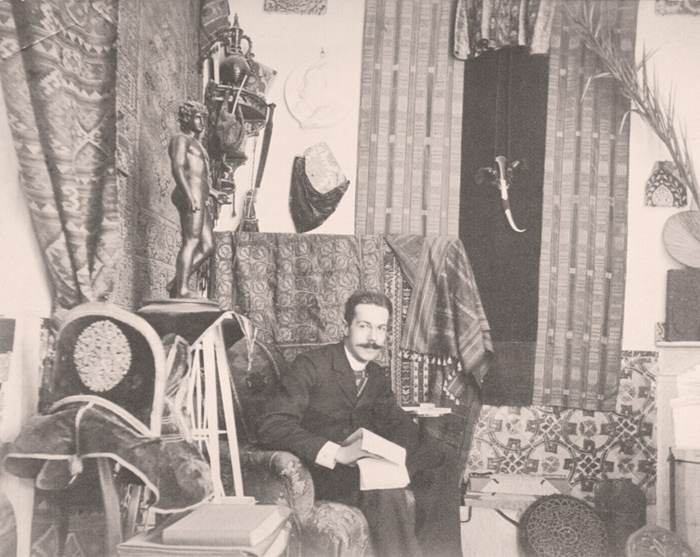
Paul Gauckler in his apartment in Tunis.

The basilica was rediscovered during excavations carried out in 1899 by Paul Gauckler, who was investigating Punic necropolises.

Most of the building's mosaics, discovered in what was described as "a remarkable state of preservation", were not removed and were left exposed after their discovery; they have since disappeared. Nevertheless, some mosaics were preserved and transferred to the Bardo National Museum, the Carthage National Museum, including the Embassy of Tunisia in France.

== Description ==
=== Architecture ===
The entire complex measures 40 metres (130 ft) by 31 metres (102 ft).

==== Basilica and annexes ====
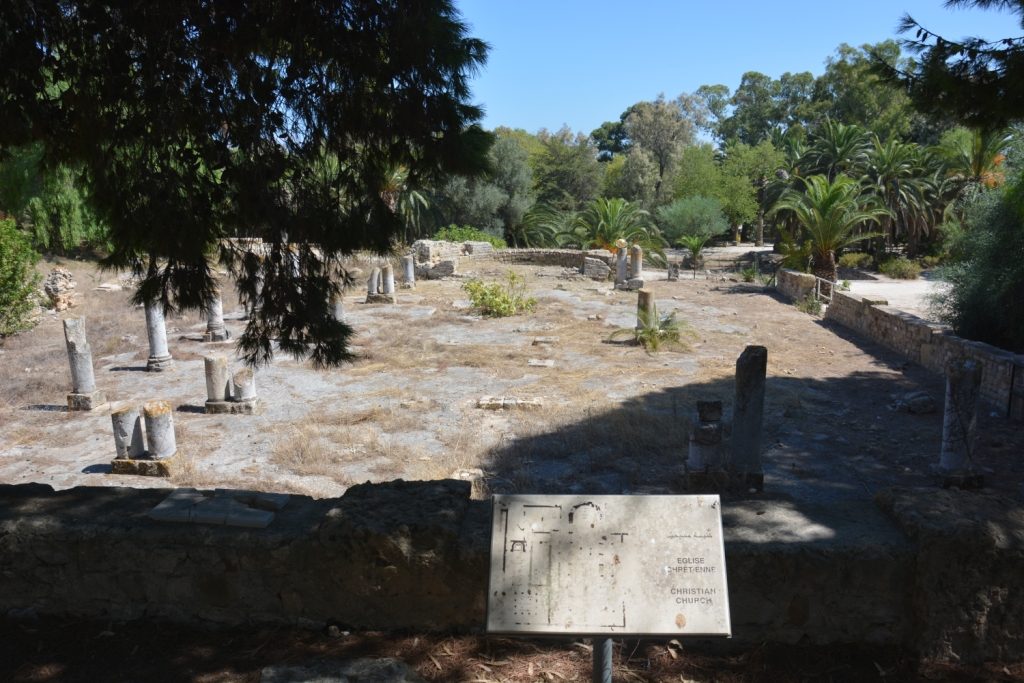
General view in 2012.

The present building is a five-aisled basilica with nine bays, an apse to the east (Note: Ennabli and Slim, 1993, p. 43.) and an entrance on the south side. (Note: Ennabli, 2000, p. 47.) The southern entrance was located on this side because the building stands on the lower slopes of Bordj Djedid Hill. The basilica is 21 metres (69 ft) wide and 35.5 metres (116 ft) long, covering an area of 750 square metres (8,100 sq ft). The quadratum populi, the area reserved for the congregation, measures 26 metres (85 ft) by 20 metres (66 ft).

The walls were built in opus africanum, are relatively thin, and the roof was probably tiled (Note: Gauckler, 1913, pp. 12–13.) and had a double-pitched design. The walls were decorated with stucco, marble slabs, and porphyry panels. The columns and capitals are all reused architectural elements of widely differing types and colours.,

The central nave, 8.35 metres (27.4 ft) wide according to Noël Duval, is lined with paired columns. The apse is raised 0.25 metres (9.8 in) above the rest of the building.The bays are approximately 3 metres (9.8 ft) deep. During a second construction phase, the chancel was enclosed with chancel barriers. The altar, situated in front of the apse, (Note: Baratte et al., 2014, p. 116.) was surmounted by a ciborium, beneath which, under the mosaic floor, a reliquary made of marble from Chemtou was discovered inside a cavity measuring 0.75 metres (2 ft 6 in) by 0.60 metres (2 ft 0 in).

In addition to the basilica itself, the complex includes annexes, a chapel, and several other rooms, (Note: Ennabli, 2000, pp. 46–47.) including two rooms traditionally identified as sacristies alongside the apse (Note: Picard, 1951, p. 50.) as well as an archive room. Recent studies, however, question the identification of the two sacristies. The ancillary buildings are located to the northeast.

==== Baptistery complex ====
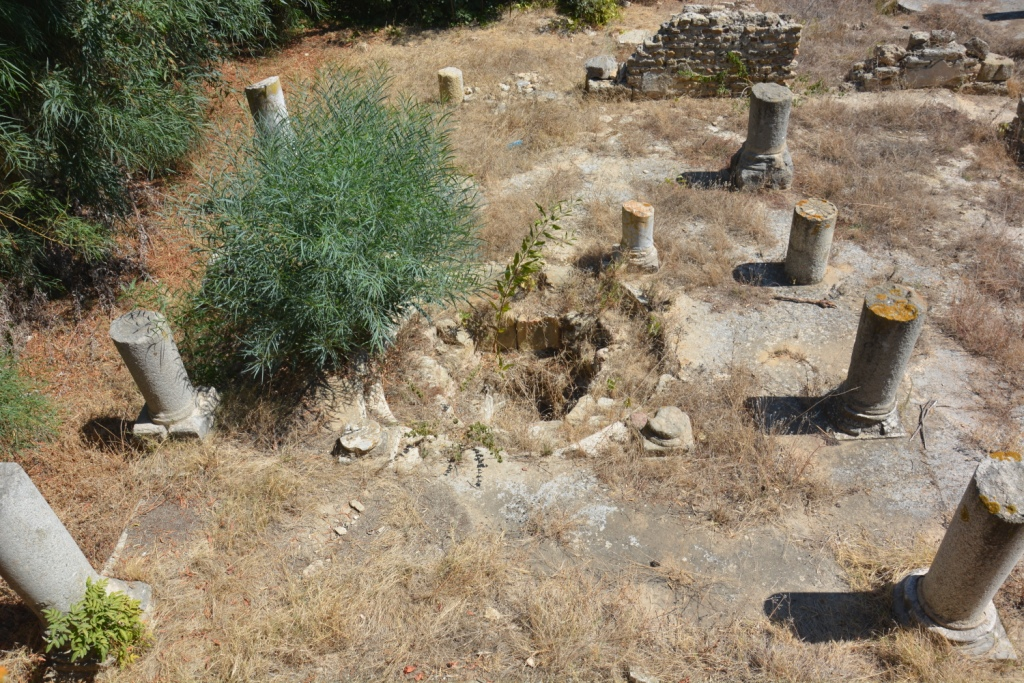
The baptistery in 2012.

The baptistery is situated north of the basilica. Together with the adjoining chapel, it formed a single baptismal complex. (Note: Gauckler, 1913, p. 15.)

The baptistery has two doorways and measures 12.50 metres (41.0 ft) by 10.25 metres (33.6 ft). Its hexagonal baptismal font was supplied with water from cisterns that had originally been Punic funerary chambers. A second cistern stored water used for maintaining the building. The font, constructed of small masonry units bonded with waterproof mortar and faced with white marble, is similar to that of the Basilica of Damous El Karita. (Note: Gauckler, 1913, pp. 15–16.)

A doorway connects the baptistery to an adjoining chapel measuring 12.50 metres (41.0 ft) long by 8.25 metres (27.1 ft) wide, which has three aisles. A reliquary was discovered beneath its ciborium. (Note: Ennabli, 2000, p. 49.) The apse probably served as a martyrium. The complex also included a colonnaded atrium and service buildings reserved for the clergy. At least three rooms to the northeast were connected to the church by a corridor.

=== Mosaics and decoration ===
Originally, the exterior walls of the building were coated with plaster, while the interior was decorated with stucco, painted ornamentation, and marble and porphyry revetments. The building was also richly adorned with mosaics. A terracotta tile from the upper parts of the structure was recovered, as was a fragment of a sarcophagus that is now housed in the collections of the Bardo National Museum.

The columns used in the quadratum populi, as well as the capitals, are reused architectural elements. The mosaic pavement of the quadratum populi is decorated with a geometric pattern. (Note: Ennabli, 2000, pp. 47–48.),

The baptismal font was originally faced with marble and was accessed by two staircases. Its canopy was supported by columns of pink marble from Chemtou., The walls of the baptistery were richly decorated with painted ornamentation.

The entrance to the chapel is paved with a mosaic featuring a pattern of "alternating wave-like shells". The chapel probably contained a marble cathedra. The apse mosaic depicted two pheasants, while the nave was paved with a geometric mosaic incorporating birds and crosses.

== Interpretation ==
The building raises questions both about its place within the district corresponding to the present-day archaeological park and about the broader organization of Christian worship in Carthage.

=== Other Christian buildings in the park ===
Dermech Basilica II has three aisles and measures 20 metres (66 ft) by 18 metres (59 ft), or 30 metres (98 ft) by 18 metres (59 ft) according to Picard. (Note: Baratte et al., 2014, p. 119.) The central nave is approximately 9.80 metres (32.2 ft) wide and each side aisle about 4.10 metres (13.5 ft) wide. The building was decorated with a rich geometric mosaic incorporating Christian symbolism and birds. Located near an area where pottery kilns have been discovered, the basilica was heavily damaged by Gauckler's excavations of the Punic necropolises. Further excavations were conducted in 1943–1944 under the direction of Gilbert Charles-Picard, followed by additional investigations during the 1990s. The building remains poorly known because part of it lies beneath modern roads, but it has nevertheless been dated to the 5th century and to the Byzantine period. (Note: Baratte et al., 2014, pp. 119–120.)

The building known as Dermech Basilica III lies northwest of the Baths of Antoninus, between Cardo XVII and the wall of the public latrines. It was found in a very poor state of preservation, with only two apses and portions of walls surviving. Excavations carried out between February and July 1952 uncovered evidence that it had been destroyed by fire. Measuring 46.50 metres (152.6 ft) by 17.50 metres (57.4 ft), the structure has generally been identified as a double-apsed church, although Liliane Ennabli instead interpreted it as "two opposing funerary chapels". The excavation yielded the funerary mosaic of Marina, dated to the 6th century. (Note: Baratte et al., 2014, pp. 120–121.)

=== The building among the churches of Carthage ===
According to Gauckler, the Dermech Basilica "must have been of considerable importance despite its modest dimensions", and he suggested that it may even have been more lavishly decorated than the great Basilica of Damous El Karita. More recent scholarship regards it as "one of the major basilicas of Carthage".

The excavations yielded no inscriptions that could identify the church or establish its dedication among the seventeen basilicas of Carthage mentioned in written sources. In keeping with his proposed chronology, Gauckler cautiously suggested that it might be identified either with the basilica of Thrasamund or with the Basilica of Saint Primus, built under Justinian I. He ultimately concluded only that it had been "one of the most important sanctuaries of Carthage".

== Notes and references ==
- Carthage chrétienne
- Basiliques chrétiennes d’Afrique du Nord
- Carthage
- Basiliques chrétiennes de Tunisie (1892–1904)

== See also ==
=== Related articles ===
- Archaeological Site of Carthage
- History of Carthage

=== External links ===
- Les basiliques de Dermech on zaherkammoun.com (in French)

=== Bibliography ===
==== General works ====
- Baratte, François; Béjaoui, Fathi; Duval, Noël; Berraho, Sarah; Gui, Isabelle; Jacquest, Hélène (2014). Basiliques chrétiennes d’Afrique du Nord [Christian Basilicas of North Africa]. Inventaire des monuments de la Tunisie (in French). Vol. II. Bordeaux: Ausonius. p. 319.
- Beschaouch, Azedine (2001). La légende de Carthage [The Legend of Carthage] (in French). Paris: Gallimard. ISBN 2-07-053212-7.
- Slim, Hédi; Fauqué, Nicolas (2001). La Tunisie antique (in French). Paris: Mengès. p. 259. ISBN 978-2-85620-421-4.
- Slim, Hédi; Mahjoubi, Ammar; Belkhodja, Khaled; Ennabli, Abdelmajid (2003). "L'Antiquité" [Antiquity]. Histoire générale de la Tunisie [General History of Tunisia] (in French). Vol. I. Paris: Maisonneuve et Larose. ISBN 978-2-7068-1695-6.
- Duval, Noël (1972). "Études d'architecture chrétienne nord-africaine" [Studies in North African Christian Architecture]. MEFRA (in French). 84 (2): 1071–1172.
- Duval, Noël (1993). "Les monuments de culte chrétien et les cimetières [de Carthage]" [Christian Religious Monuments and Cemeteries [of Carthage]]. Encyclopédie berbère (in French). XII: 1804–1812.
- Ennabli, Abdelmajid; Slim, Hédi (1993). Carthage le site archéologique [Carthage: The Archaeological Site] (in French). Tunis: Cérès.
- Ennabli, Abdelmajid; Fradier, Georges; Pérez, Jacques (1995). Carthage retrouvée [Carthage Rediscovered] (in French). Tunis/Paris: Cérès/Herscher. ISBN 9973-19-055-6.
- Ennabli, Liliane (1997). Carthage, une métropole chrétienne du siècle [Carthage, a Christian Metropolis from the 4th to the Late 7th Century] (in French). Paris: CNRS. p. 179. ISBN 2-271-05402-8.
- Ennabli, Liliane (2000). Carthage chrétienne [Christian Carthage] (in French). Tunis: Agence de mise en valeur du patrimoine et de promotion culturelle.
- Picard, Colette (1951). Carthage [Carthage] (in French). Paris: Les Belles Lettres.
- Gauckler, Paul (1913). Basiliques chrétiennes de Tunisie (1892-1904) [Christian Basilicas of Tunisia (1892–1904)] (in French). Paris: Librairie Alphonse Picard et fils. p. 48.
- Vaultrin, J. "Les basiliques chrétiennes de Carthage". Revue africaine, 73, pp. 182–318, 1932.
