= Asterius Chapel =

Underground Christian building dating from the 5th - 7th centuries

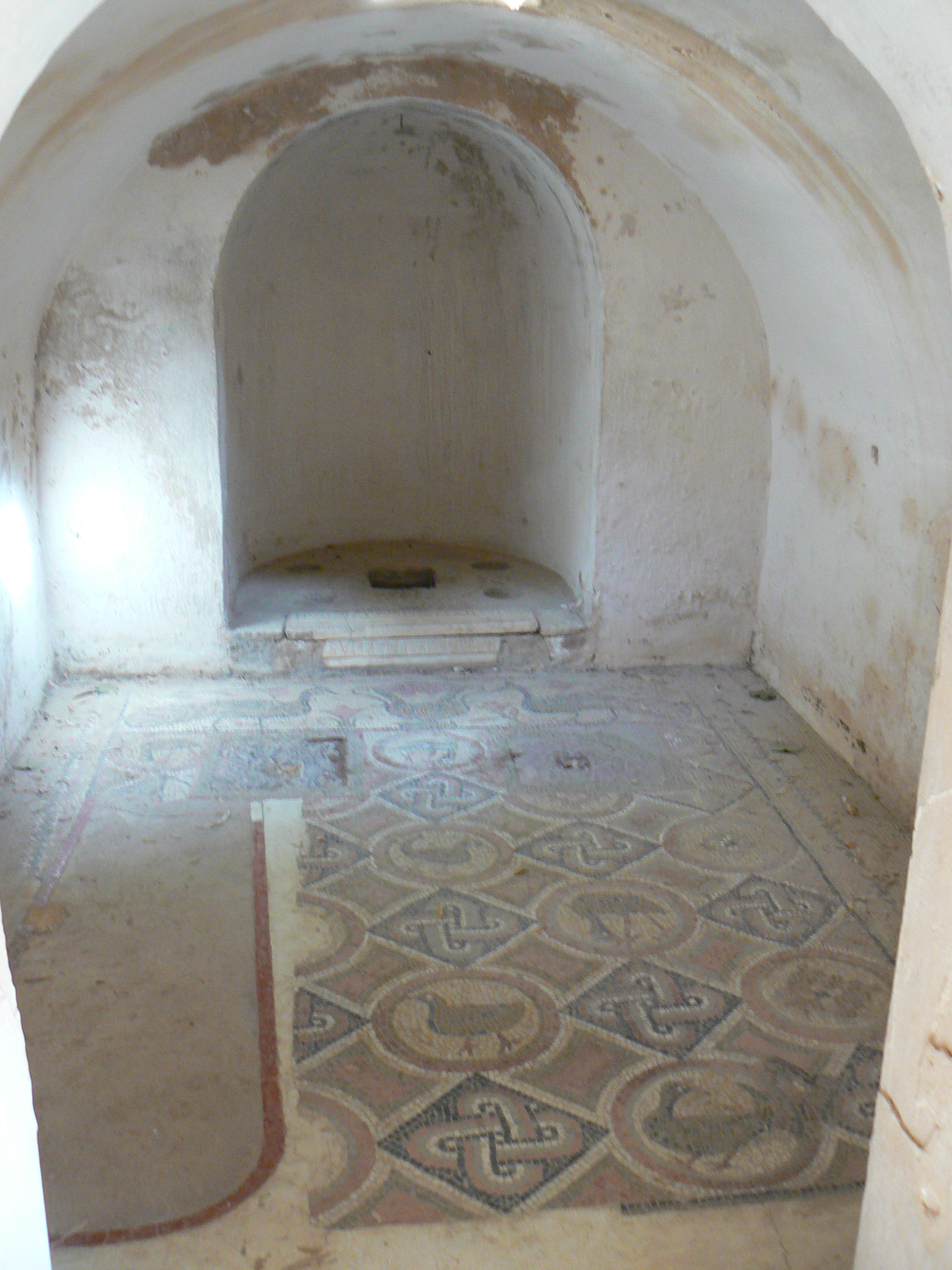

- Location within Tunisia

Religion
- Affiliation: Christianism

Location
- Location: Carthage
- Country: Tunisia
- Interactive map of Asterius Chapel
- Coordinates: 36°51′16″N 10°19′57″E

The Asterius chapel (French: Chapelle d'Astérius) is a small underground Christian building dating from the 5th-7th centuries, now located within the archaeological park of the Baths of Antoninus in the archaeological site of Carthage, Tunisia.

The building - whose function is unknown, although specialists believe it must have had both a liturgical and funerary function - was previously located on the Sayda plateau, formerly known as the "hill of sainte-Monique". The monument was located at the heart of an area that yielded both a late necropolis and cult buildings. It bears witness to the pivotal period between the Vandal kingdom and the Byzantine reconquest of present-day Tunisia.

During excavations in the 1950s, it was decided to move it to the Baths of Antoninus archaeological park, given its state of preservation, so that the mosaic decoration would not be lost as a result of urban development in the area.

== Location ==
General map of the Carthage archaeological site, the chapel is now located between no. 14 (Punic necropolis) and no. 15 (Antonine baths).

The Asterius chapel is located within the archaeological park of Baths of Antoninus, but comes from an excavation in the Lyceum district of Carthage, northeast of the city, (Note: Duval (1972), p. 1081) on the hill of . (Note: Duval (1972), p. 1077) (Note: Duval (1972), p. 102)

== History ==
=== Ancient history ===
==== History of the ancient city area ====
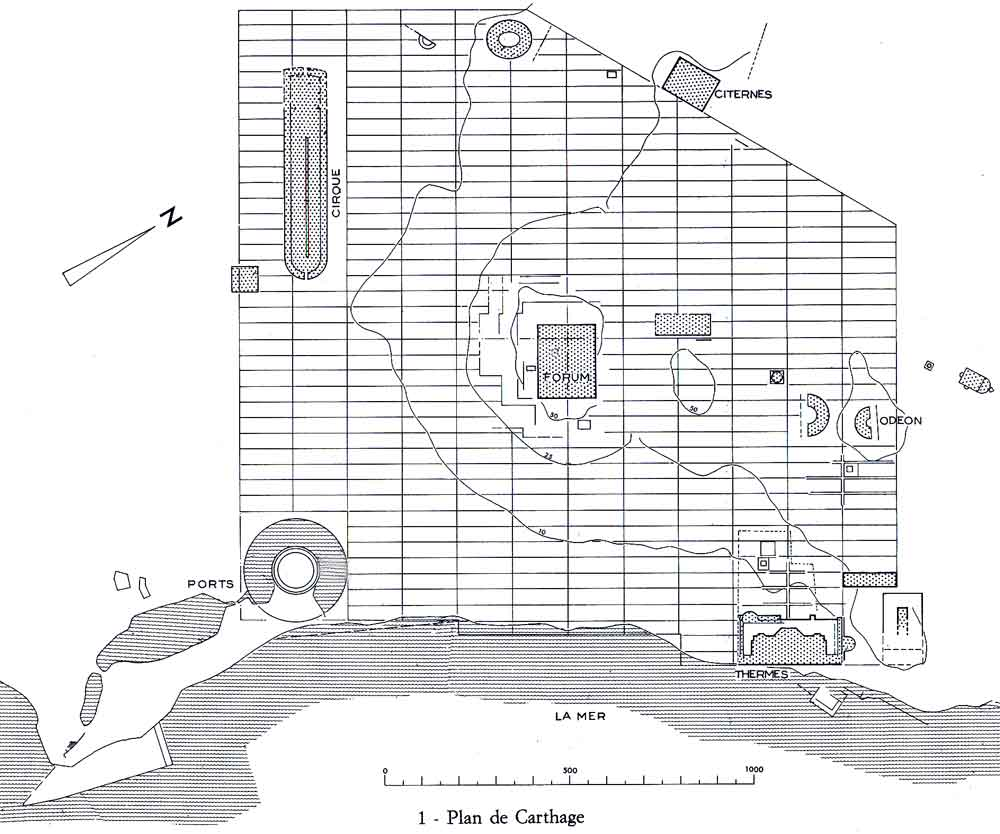
Plan of Roman Carthage with the urban grid.

Urbanization of the area was "late but regular". (Note: Ennabli (1997), p. 108)

The area in which the chapel was found is located on the outskirts of the ancient city, like many Christian buildings. The chapel was discovered in a Byzantine necropolis, (Note: Ennabli (1997), p. 103) which may have included a church. (Note: Duval (1972), p. 1100)

The burials in the necropolis were pits covered with flagstones. (Note: Ennabli (2020), p. 194) The necropolis was surrounded by an enclosure wall, part of which has been identified. Several tombs were excavated, including a painted and stuccoed vault and another with a marble sarcophagus containing a lead coffin. (Note: Ennabli (1997), p. 104) Another burial chapel, known as the Chapel of Redemptus, measured 4 m by 6.50 m and was sparsely decorated. The sarcophagus bears the name of the chapel's owner.

==== Proximity to a religious complex ====
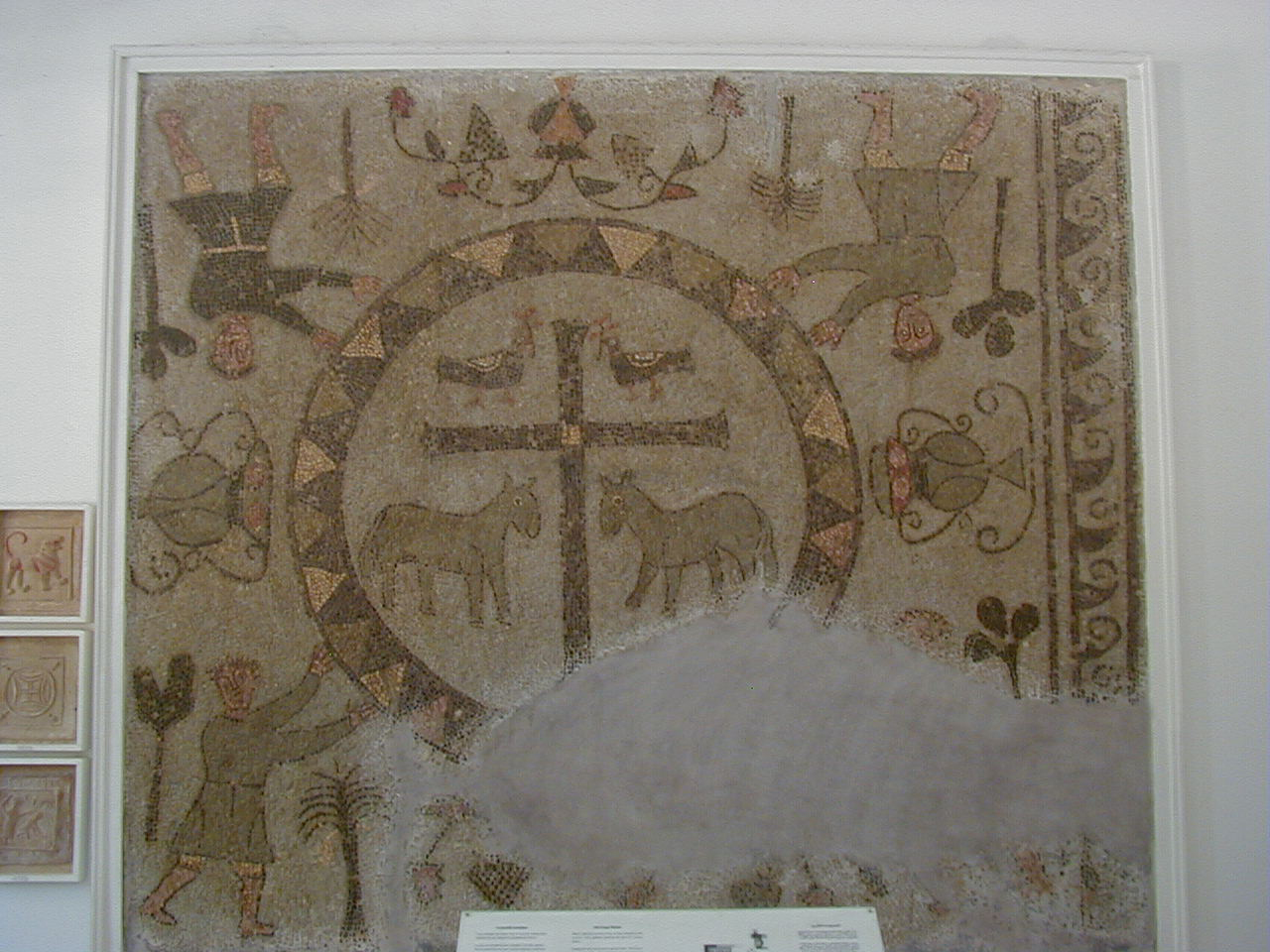
Mosaic of the four evangelists, found in a house in the vicus castrorum.

Near the chapel was a cult complex, four rooms of which were excavated, including an underground chamber. The complex was dated to the second half of the 5th century on the basis of coins. A baptistery was present, and one of the rooms featured paintings of saints. Christian graffiti were also found. (Note: Ennabli (1997), p. 105)

The space was later refurbished with a more sumptuous décor, featuring floor mosaics and stucco or paintings on the walls, and sometimes marble. (Note: Ennabli (1997), pp. 105–106) Above-ground rooms dating back to the first century. (Note: Ennabli (1997), p. 106)

The baptistery, fed by a well, is "the most remarkable part of the complex": four-lobed in shape, with access via steps on the north-west side. The cells were mosaic-covered, and the bottom of the vat was lined with marble. A ciborium and baldachin covered the baptistery. A chancel isolated the area from the rest of the room. The baptistery area featured painted figures with halos, one of whom has been identified as Saturus, one of Perpetua and Felicity's companions. (Note: Ennabli (1997), p. 107) The Basilica Majorum was dedicated to these martyrs, and the same may have been true of this building. (Note: Ennabli (1997), pp. 107–108)

One dwelling in the area, the vicus castrorum, not far from the Kobba Bent el Rey, yielded the mosaic known as the Four Evangelists, while another yielded the mosaic known as the Lady of Carthage. (Note: Ennabli (1997), p. 109)

==== History of the building ====
The building has the same orientation as the town's urban grid. (Note: Baratte et al. (2014), p. 122) It may have reused a cistern, and the vaulting was built before the internal fittings. The apse was added later. (Note: Baratte et al. (2014), p. 123) The building had two periods in its history and was in use for a long time. (Note: Duval & Lézine (1959b), p. 352)

The name Asterius appears on a reused inscription on a step. Asterius was not the name of the deceased who occupied the tomb. A skull was found under the mosaic pavement. A tomb was built after this mosaic. According to the paleographic study of the reused inscriptions, the building was not built before the 5th century. (Note: Duval & Lézine (1959b), p. 353)

During excavations, archaeologists found three Maurice Tiberius coins under the mosaic, (Note: Duval (1972), p. 1101) dating from the building's second state. The burial site of Asterius, violated at an undetermined time, yielded a skull. (Note: Duval & Lézine (1959b), p. 344) According to Liliane Ennabli, the building is dated 586-587.

The monument was repaired until the reign of Heraclius. According to Noël Duval, the baptistery and underground installation may be linked to an occupation during the Vandal period, when the Arians took control of the buildings. The site would have been modified and richly decorated at a later date.

=== Modern history and rediscovery of the site ===
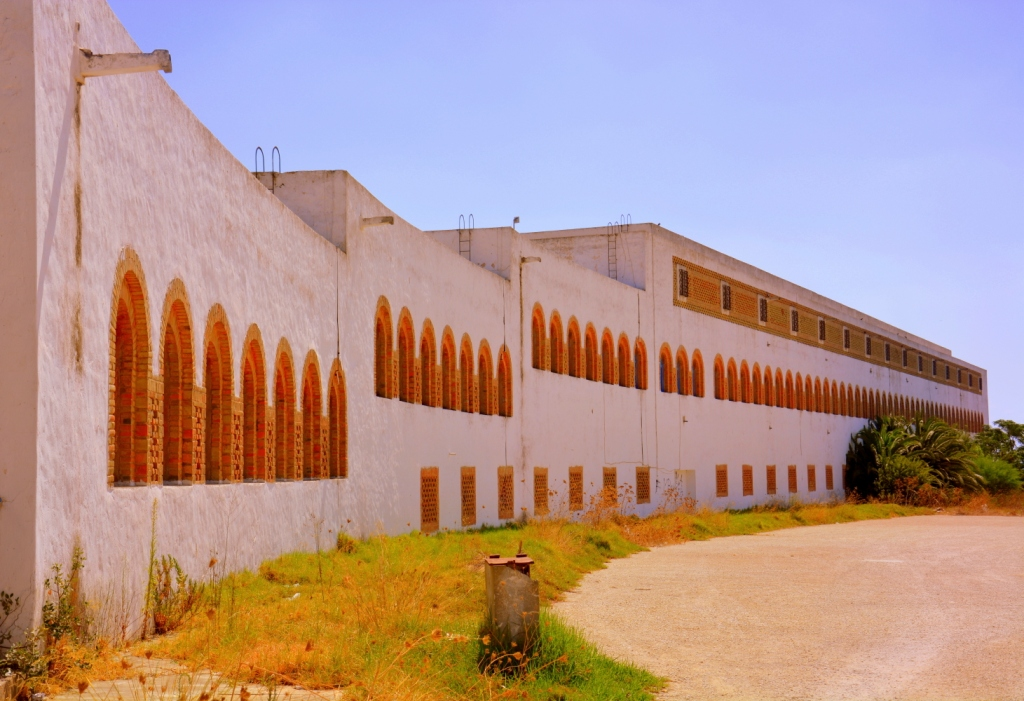
Carthage Lycée.

The chapel was discovered in December 1950, along with other Palaeochristian burials, during work to build a villa on a housing estate between the Carthage Lyceum and the Fontaine aux mille amphores (Fountain of a Thousand Amphorae). The building in question is the most monumental discovery made at the time, (Note: Duval & Lézine (1959b), p. 339) and is in "an exceptional state of preservation". According to François Baratte, the site may now be occupied by the Lyceum.

The excavation was only partial, as four tombs, epitaphs and a fragment of an enclosure were uncovered. One of the tombs has a stuccoed decoration that has almost disappeared, another has a marble sarcophagus containing a lead coffin, and two underground funerary chapels with a similar layout have been found.

Map of the Antoninian Baths archaeological park with the current location of the chapel (no. 1).

In addition to the Asterius chapel, the so-called Redemptus chapel was excavated in April 1955. Rédemptus, bursar of "the fifth ecclesiastical region of Carthage", died in the second half of the second century. (Note: Ennabli (1997), pp. 103–104)

The chapel of Asterius, the best preserved but condemned to destruction for the construction of the Lyceum, was relocated; the decorative elements were more precisely replaced in a building of similar plan erected in the archaeological park of Antonin's baths. The building was reconstructed in the park in early 1951 by the architectural department of the Tunisian Antiquities and Arts Authority, under the direction of Alexandre Lézine. (Note: Duval & Lézine (1959b), pp. 339–340)

The cult complex was excavated in 1955-1956, despite the destruction that had taken place prior to archaeological research. Underground elements built in tuff were still present. These elements sometimes reused pre-existing constructions such as cisterns.

== Description of the building and current remains ==
The building is an early Christian funerary chapel. The dimensions of the monument are proportionate to the Roman foot. (Note: Duval & Lézine (1959b), p. 347)

=== Architecture ===
==== General features ====
The building has "the shape of a church in reduction". The burial chamber is 2 m high and trapezoidal in shape, measuring 2.92 m-3.96 m by 2.42 m-2.46 m.

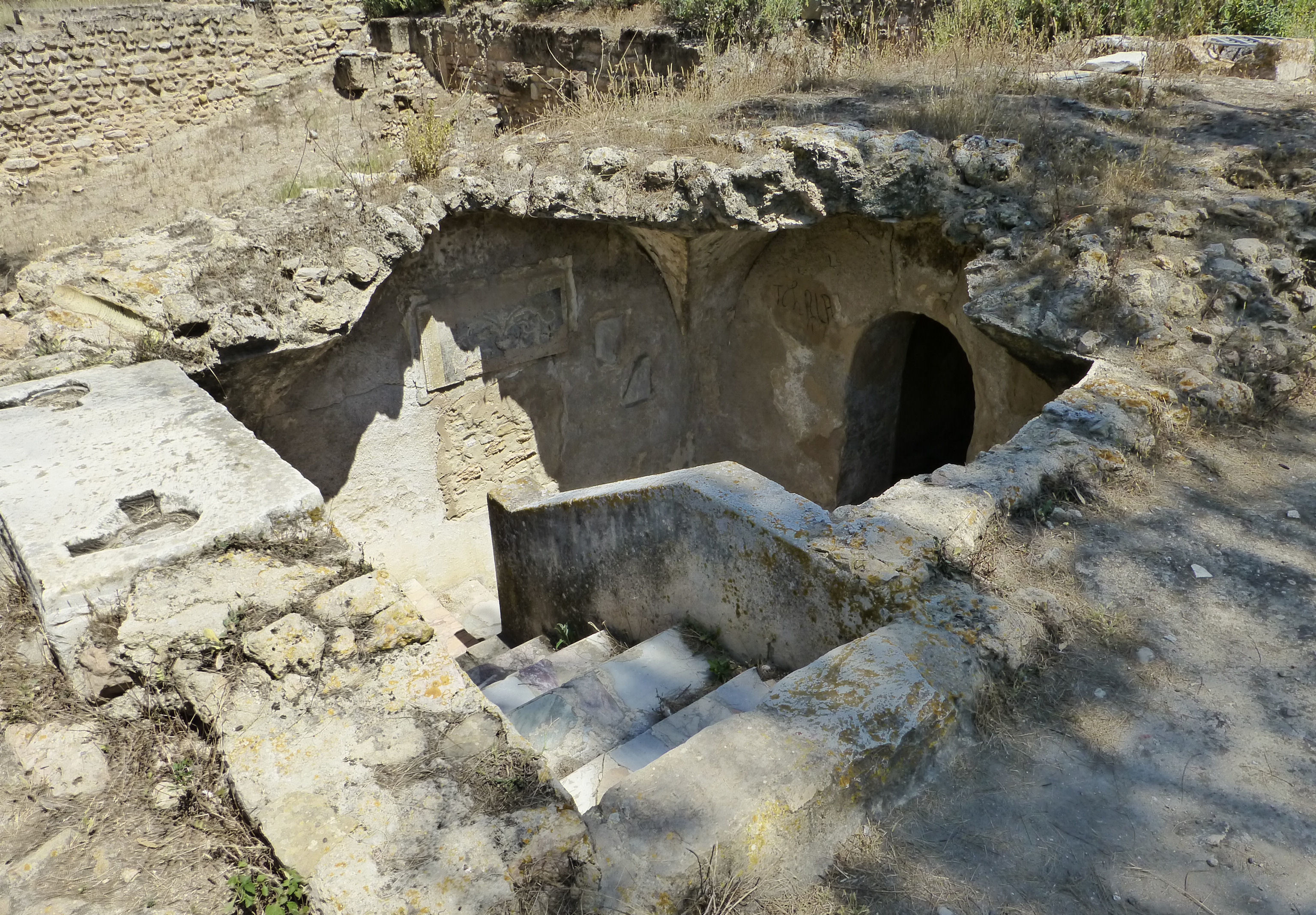
Panorama of the chapel (exterior view).

The chapel was carved out of tuff rock, with masonry additions and a rubble stone vault. An angled staircase provided access to the semi-subterranean building, 1.50 m below ground level. (Note: Duval & Lézine (1959b), p. 340) The staircase was masonry.

Layout of the chapel

The chapel comprises a vaulted room and a south-east-facing apse, 16 cm higher than the rest of the room. It is small, measuring 4.20 m by 2.45 m for a total dimension of 6.60 m by 3 m, with the extrados of the vault rising to 2 m. The passageway measures 1.04 m and the room is trapezoidal in shape. The walls are 1.36 m and 1.66 m high. The north-east wall of the main hall measures 3.06 m, while the south-west wall is 2.92 m high. The other sides are 2.42 m and 2.46 m high. (Note: Duval & Lézine (1959b), p. 342)

==== Main room and apse ====
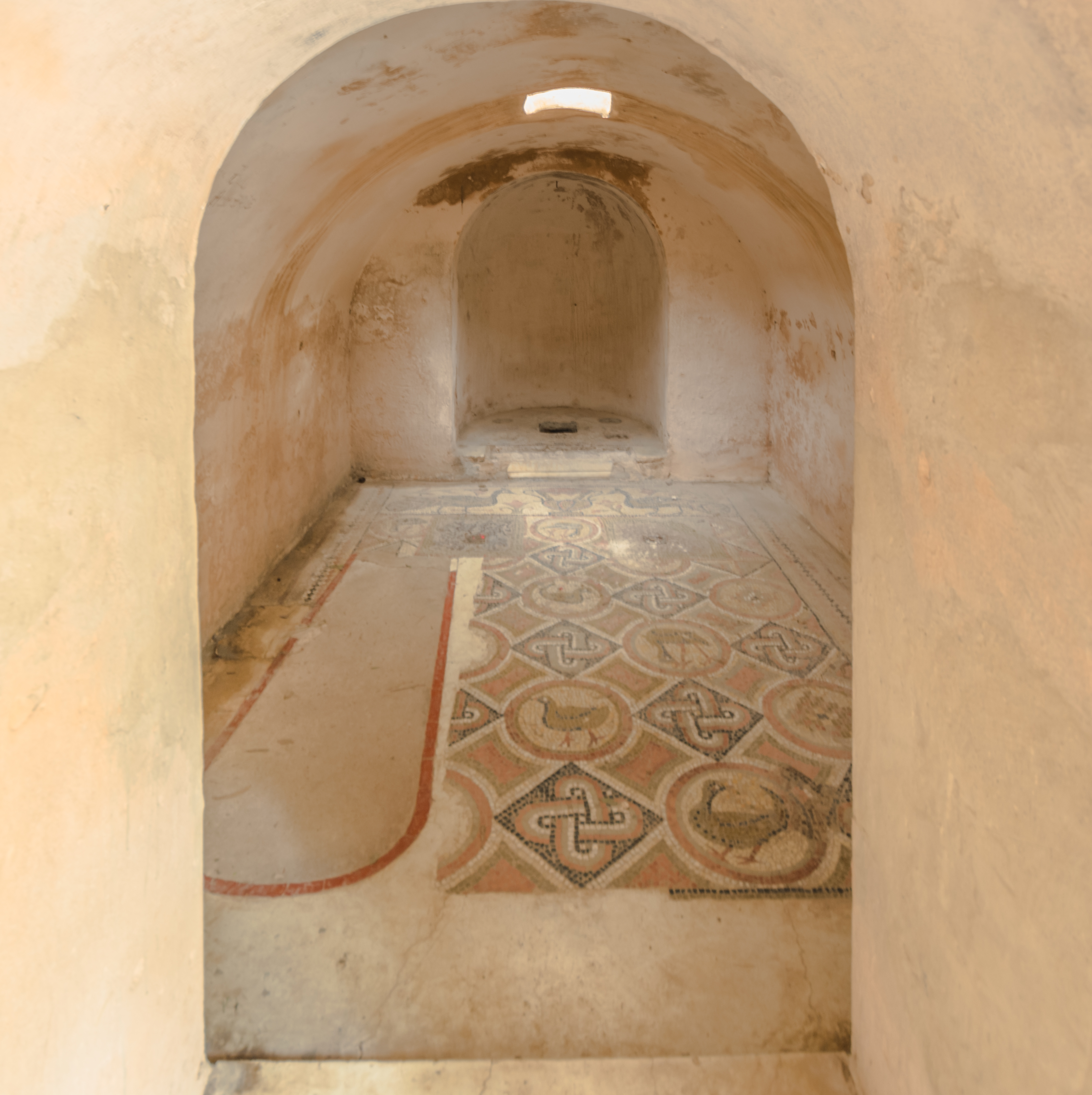
Nave and apse at far end.

The south-east-facing apse is a cul-de-four. Shaped like a "half-ellipse", (Note: Duval & Lézine (1959b), p. 346) it measures 1.23 m by 1.17 m with a marble step. The apse features an altar above a reliquary, and the chancel, which separates the quadratum populi and the presbyterium, has been preserved, as has the location of the altar base. The loculus that housed the reliquary was found empty, and the columns supporting the altar measure around 15 cm in diameter.

The apse, which has approximately the same orientation as the decumani of the ancient city grid, is about 0.17 m higher than the nave and the ceiling is a maximum of 1.73 m high.

A chancel set into the floor by means of two posts separated the main room into two parts. Traces of the inlay are preserved in the mosaic. The chancel formed the boundary between two mosaics.

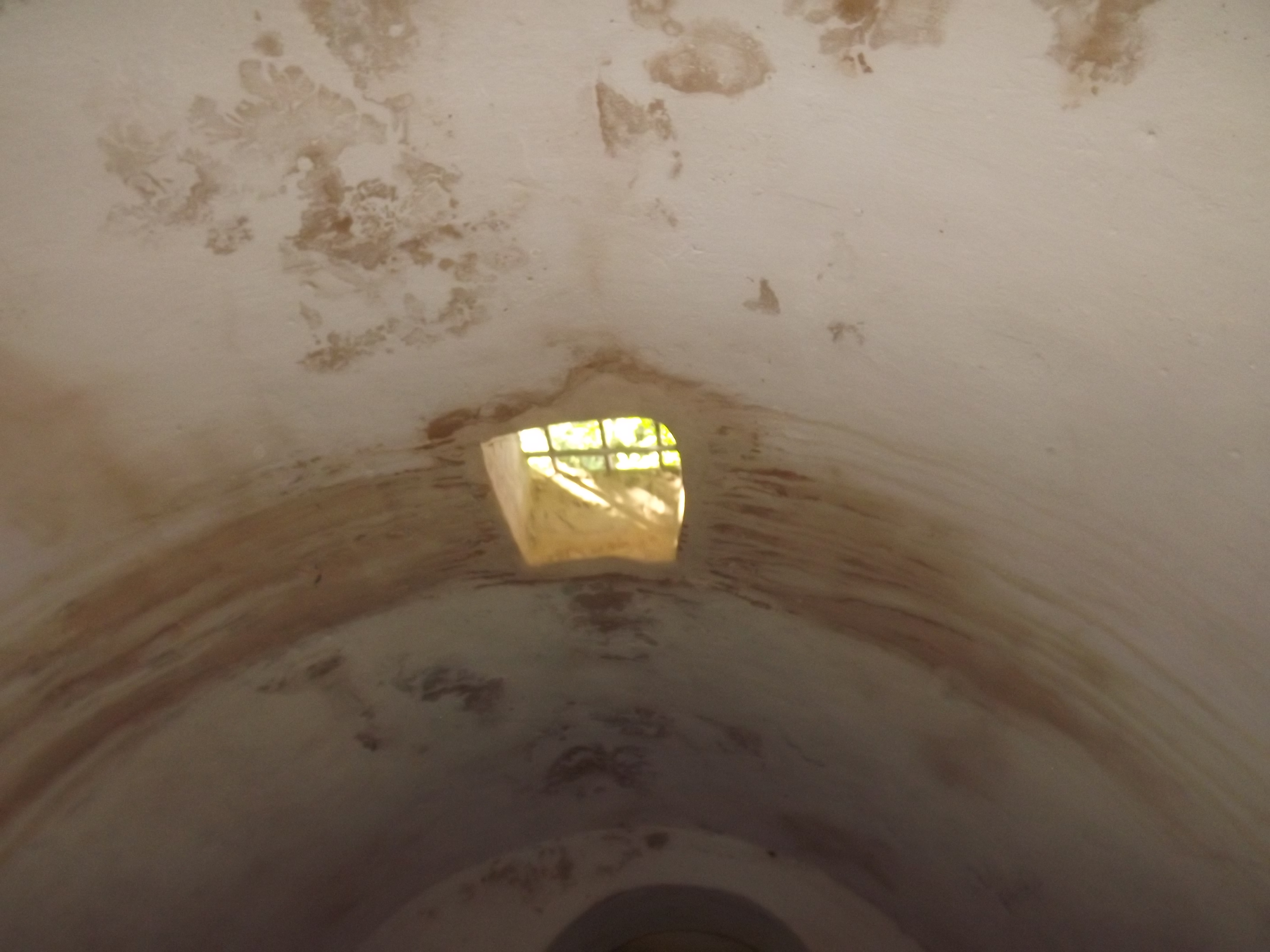
Chapel ceiling.

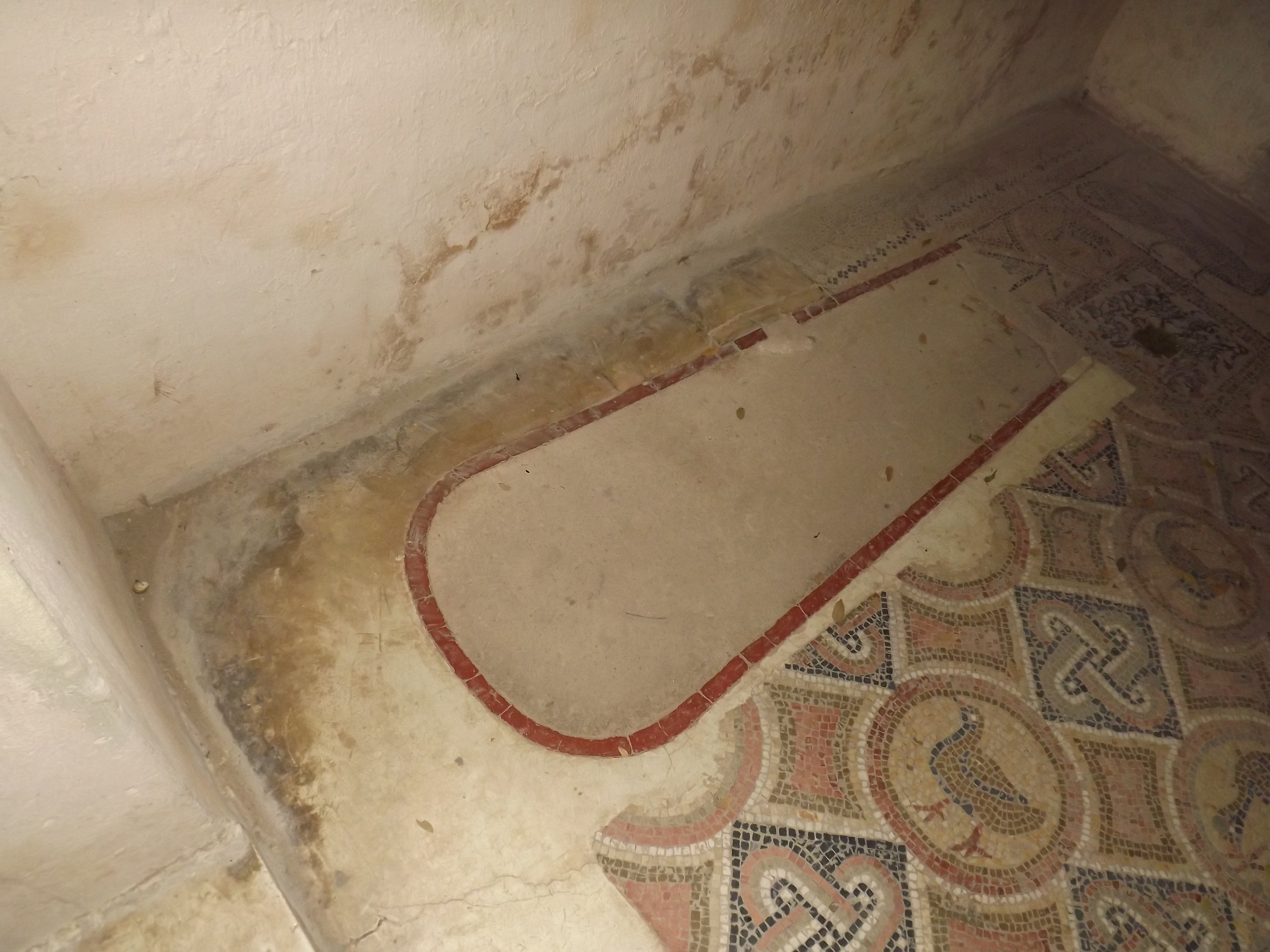
General view of the tomb site.

==== Tombs ====
The burial, located to one side and measuring 1.90 m by 0.62 m, is covered with five slabs; the epitaph had disappeared when it was discovered. The grave measures 0.62 m at the head end and 0.44 m at the opposite end. A skull was found, and a mosaic covered the grave.

=== Décor: mosaics and terracotta tiles ===
==== General characteristics ====
The chapel was carefully decorated, with murals and mosaics featuring birds in medallions in rather poor colors and rhombus shapes. The walls were decorated with stucco and paintings.

==== Mosaics ====
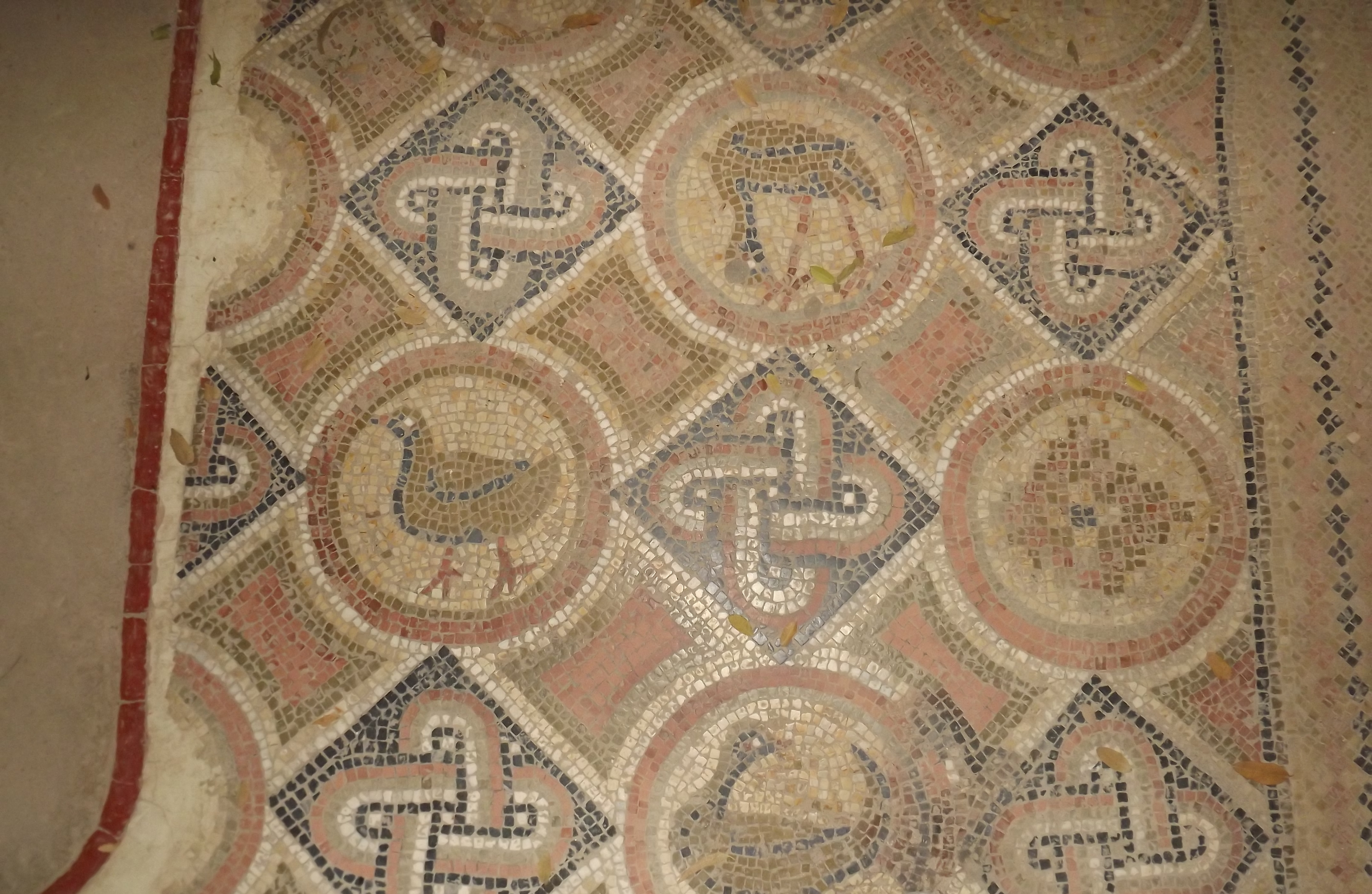
Detail of the mosaic in the main room.

The main mosaic features circular elements 0.35 m in diameter and tiles 0.25 m to 0.30 m in diameter. Quadrilaterals are also present. Birds, waders or chickens, or "diamond"-type decorations adorn the circular medallions, while the tile medallions feature a Solomon's knot. The border is checkerboard-shaped. The mosaic, damaged by the installation of a tomb, was laid on lime concrete. (Note: Duval & Lézine (1959b), p. 345) Fragments of the geometric mosaic were found during excavations, (Note: Duval & Lézine (1959b), pp. 345–346) and may correspond to the first state of the painted decoration on the walls. The current mosaic may not be "contemporary with the construction of the building"; the most recent mosaic is dated by the coins of Emperor Maurice: the late dating can be confirmed by the shape of the tesserae, the materials and the colors, comparable to Byzantine elements identified in Antonin's baths. (Note: Duval & Lézine (1959b), pp. 351–352) A slab may have marked the tomb, as in the chapel of Redemptus. A fragmentary inscription found during the excavation may have belonged to this slab, indicating a Byzantine indiction.

Hooks for hanging lighting fixtures were found on the walls.

The vestibule contains a fishy sea mosaic on a white background depicting, among other things, "a dolphin, a mullet, a shell, a torpedo and the remains of a jellyfish", while the main room contains bird and geometric motifs.

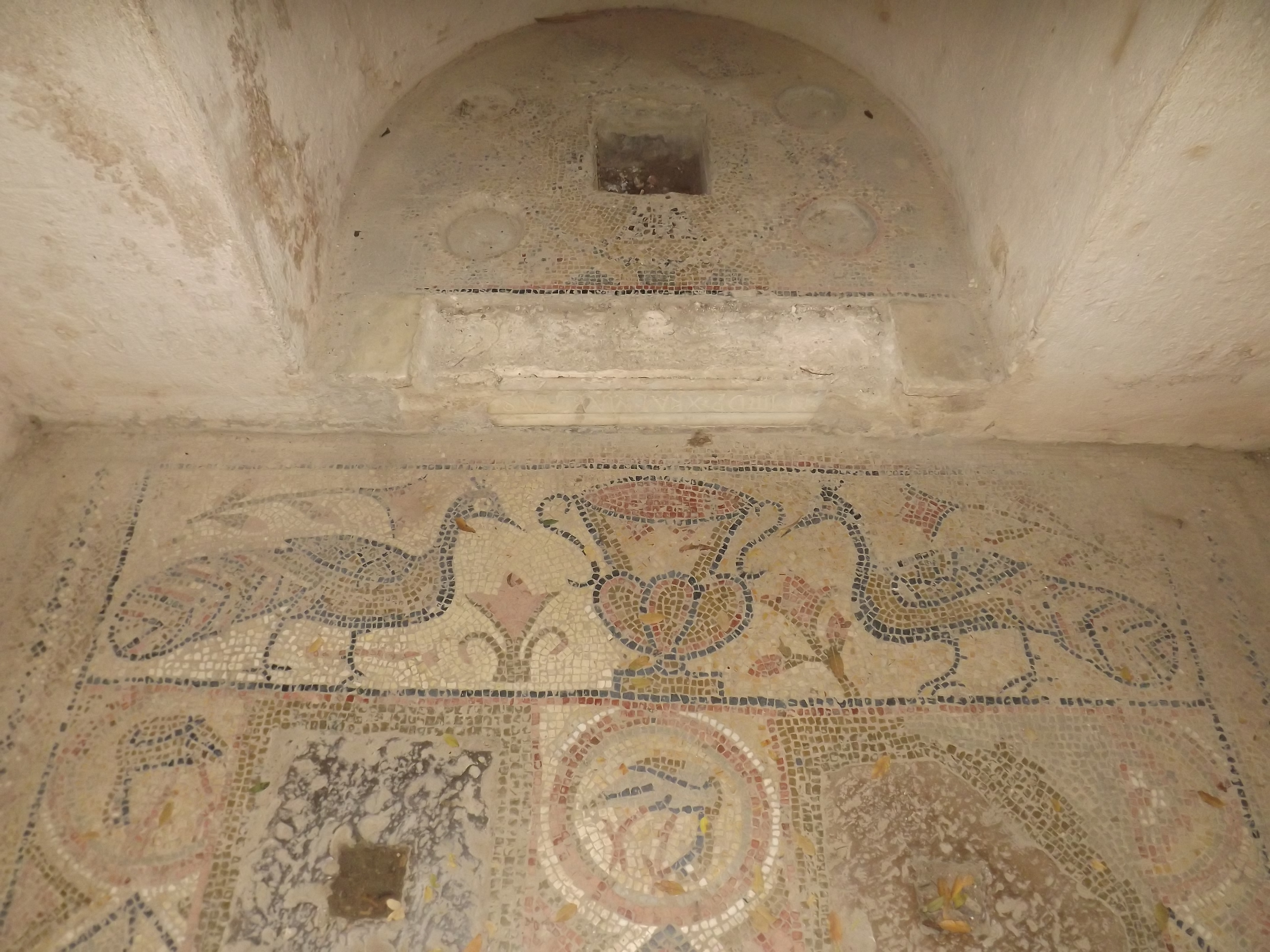
Mosaic of two peacocks facing each other.

Beyond the chancel is an area measuring 1.84 m by 0.42 m with "banal [...] decoration". A mosaic features two peacocks around a krater. The decoration features fleurons and stylized flowers.

The steps leading to the apse were decorated with marble and inscriptions. The marble elements were reused: two pieces from an architrave and two from a funerary slab. The apse featured a white-background mosaic with a medallion containing a Maltese cross, around which were slots for colonnettes intended to support an altar table, two of which were uncovered during archaeological investigations. A reliquary was present in a loculus that had been breached at an undetermined time. An earlier marble pavement was found. (Note: Duval & Lézine (1959b), pp. 346–347)

==== Painted plasters ====
The vault has preserved traces of painted plaster, a blue background and red drawings. The walls were also plastered. The plaster decoration was applied twice: first with a dominant blue "marble imitation" and then with a red base.

The apse had no painted decoration on the walls.

=== Architectural and other artifacts ===
==== Fragments of architecture ====
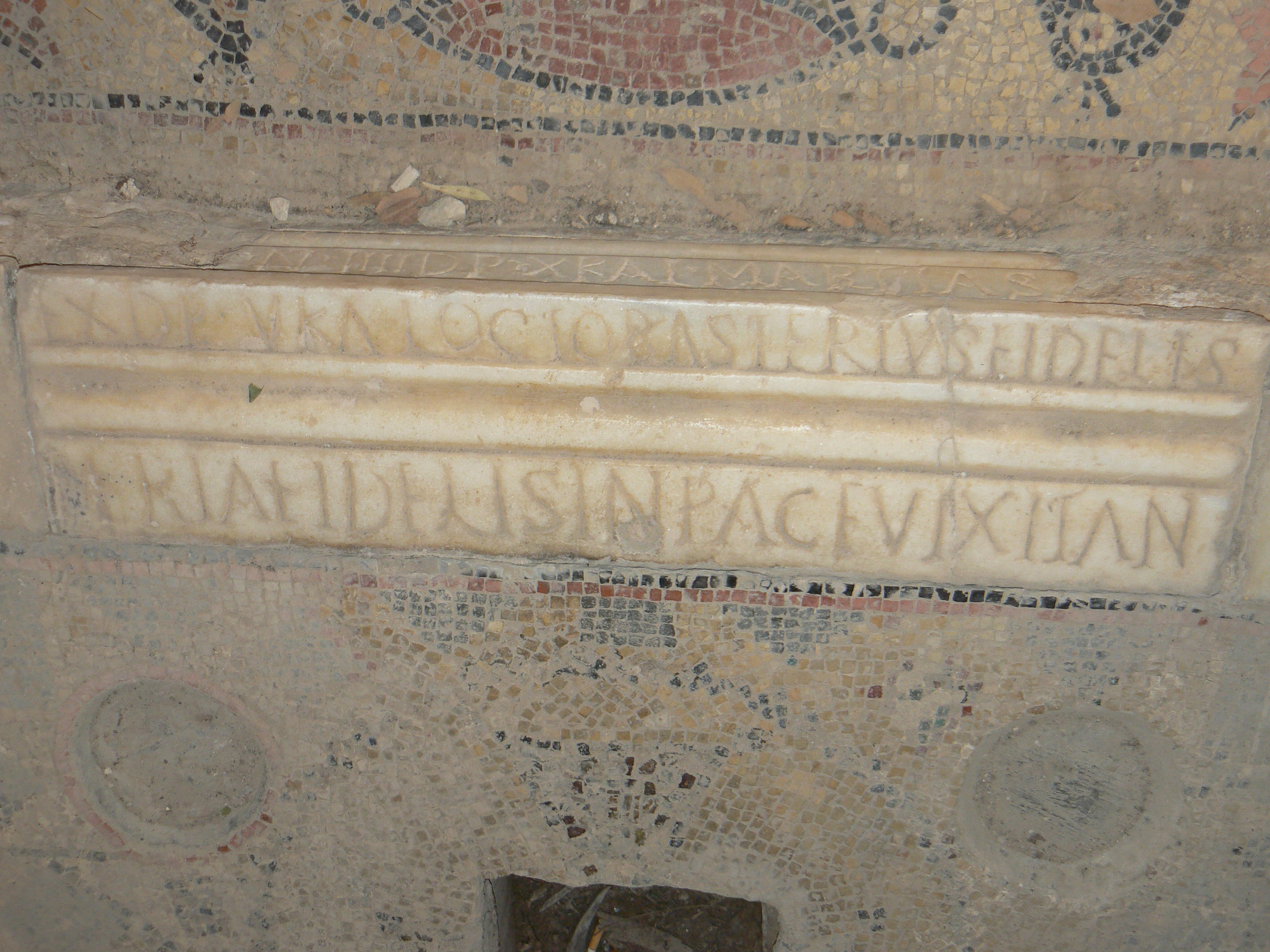
Asterius inscription.

Various architectural elements were found during excavations: a pillar cap, a corbel, fragments of an architrave, two white marble columns, one of which was present in situ in the apse. (Note: Duval & Lézine (1959b), pp. 347–348) Another reused element may have represented a Christian symbol. (Note: Duval & Lézine (1959b), p. 349)

Fragments of epitaphs have been found in reuse in the apse steps: vixit annis sex, d(e)p(ositus) V kal(endas) octob(res). Asterius fidelis.... The name Asterius is known in Jewish and Christian circles, and is used to designate the building "in early publications". (Note: Duval & Lézine (1959b), pp. 349–350)

Other epitaph fragments are present, one of which is located on the upper side of the step. Other fragmentary inscriptions were found in the excavated material. (Note: Duval & Lézine (1959b), pp. 350–351)

==== Other decorative elements or traces of equipment ====
The archaeologists also found notches that could have been used to install a curtain system. The vault revealed hooks that could have been used to install oil lamps. In the apse, archaeologists found a hook that could also have been used to install an oil lamp.

In the chapel, ceramic tiles common in the Byzantine period, i.e. in the 16th century, were unearthed. (Note: Duval (1972), pp. 1097–1098)

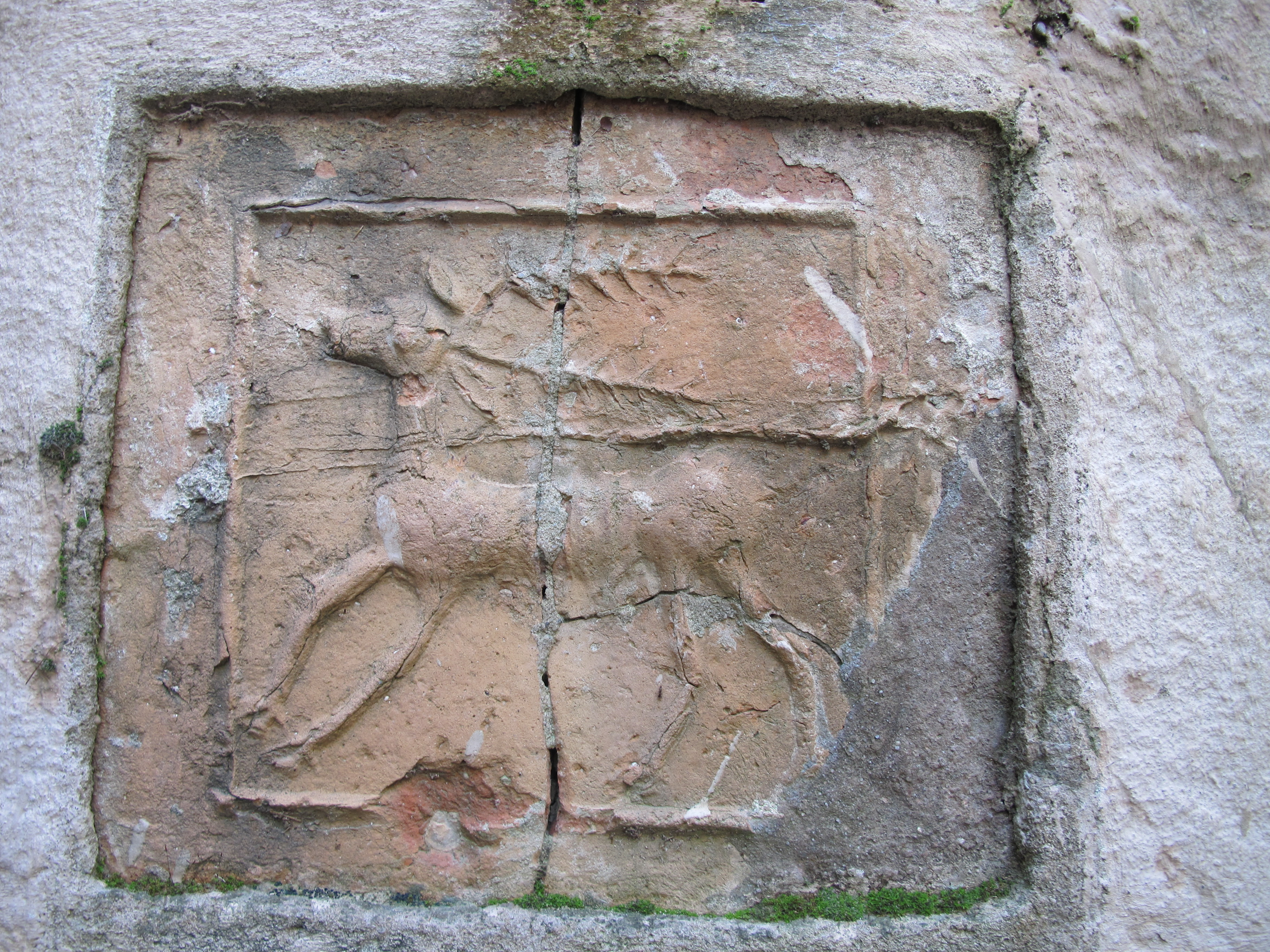
Ceramic tile with deer design.

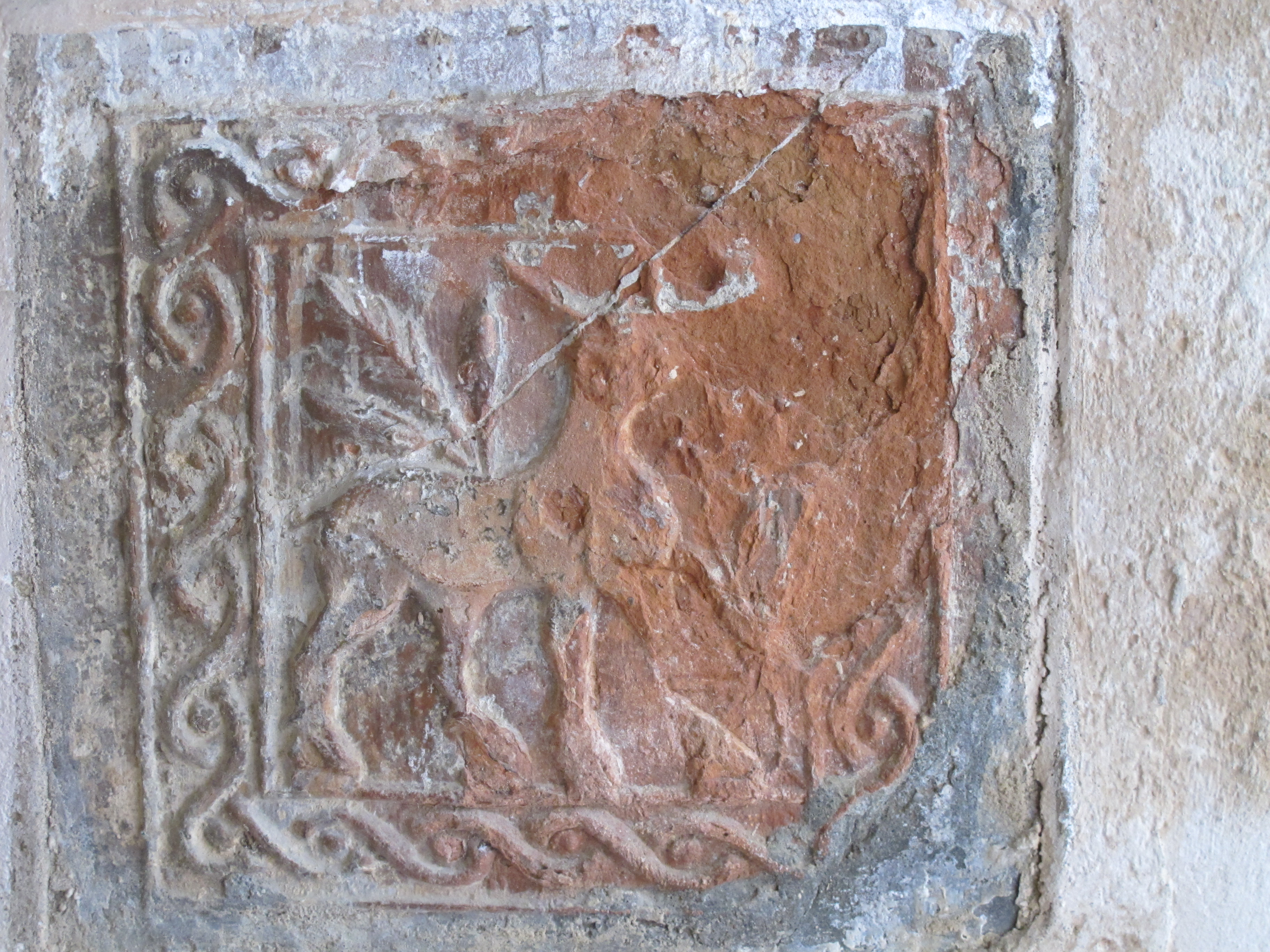
Ceramic tile.

== Interpretation ==
=== Wrong identification ===
The building's name comes from an inscription found on the steps leading to the apse, Asterius not being the name of the deceased buried in the funerary building.

=== Funerary chapel ===
The building is "a small church set in a private vault or [...] a tomb set in an underground chapel". Tombs were square, rectangular or even round. (Note: Duval & Lézine (1959b), pp. 354–355) Chapels with apses could house collective burials. (Note: Duval & Lézine (1959b), p. 355)

The building, which takes the form of a "basilica in reduction", is, like the chapel of Redemptus, a funerary chapel, a type hitherto unknown in Roman Africa. Its interest lies in its precise dating. The Asterius chapel has a plan "more or less identical" to this other chapel: a nave measuring approximately 3 m on each side and an apse. In the chapel of Redemptus, on the other hand, access is lateral and the tomb is axial, not on the side of the monument. The orientation is different in the chapel of Asterius, but was dictated by the urban layout of Carthage. (Note: Duval & Lézine (1959b), p. 354)

=== A complex building ===
A study of the chapel has revealed the existence of an altar in the apse, a feature already present in certain buildings in the Balkans, Pécs and Salona, which are however martyria where no cult is held for the deceased. (Note: Duval & Lézine (1959b), pp. 355–356) The reliquary located in the apse is there to protect the deceased. The presence of relics is well attested in African funerary inscriptions. (Note: Duval & Lézine (1959b), p. 356)

According to Noël Duval and Alexandre Lézine, the chapel of Asterius, like that of Redemptus, presents "a much more advanced type of funerary chapel, akin to a real church, without losing the private character of a simple mausoleum".

== See also ==
- History of Carthage

== Bibliography ==
=== General works ===
- Baratte, François; Béjaoui, Fathi; Duval, Noël; Berraho, Sarah; Gui, Isabelle; Jacquest, Hélène (2014). Basiliques chrétiennes d'Afrique du Nord. II (in French). Bordeaux: Ausonius. ISBN 978-2-35613-118-8.
- Beschaouch, Azedine (2001). La légende de Carthage (in French). Paris: Éditions Gallimard. ISBN 2-07-053212-7..
- Ennabli, Abdelmajid (2020). Carthage: les travaux et les jours (in French). Paris: CNRS Éditions. ISBN 978-2-271-13115-7.
- Ennabli, Abdelmajid; Fradier, Georges; Pérez, Jacques (1995). Carthage retrouvée (in French). Tunis/Paris: Cérès/Herscher. ISBN 9973-19-055-6.
- Ennabli, Abdelmajid; Slim, Hédi (1993). Carthage le site archéologique (in French). Tunis: Cérès.
- Ennabli, Liliane (2000). Carthage chrétienne (in French). Tunis: Agence de mise en valeur du patrimoine et de promotion culturelle. ISBN 978-9973917355.
- Ennabli, Liliane (1997). Carthage, une métropole chrétienne du IVèmme à la fin du VII èmme siècle (in French). Paris: CNRS. ISBN 2-271-05402-8.
- Ennabli, Liliane (1991). Les inscriptions funéraires chrétiennes de Carthage. III. Carthage intra et extra muros (in French). Rome/Paris: Publications de l'École française de Rome. ISBN 2-7283-0202-2..
- Picard, Colette (1951). Carthage (in French). Paris: Les Belles Lettres.
- Slim, Hédi; Fauqué, Nicolas (2001). La Tunisie antique: de Hannibal à saint Augustin (in French). Paris: Mengès. ISBN 978-2-85620-421-4.
- Slim, Hédi; Mahjoubi, Ammar; Belkhodja, Khaled; Ennabli, Abdelmajid (2003). Histoire générale de la Tunisie (in French). Vol. I. Paris: Maisonneuve et Larose. ISBN 978-2-7068-1695-6.

=== General articles ===
- Duval, Noël. "Carthage : les monuments de culte chrétien et les cimetières". Encyclopédie Berbère (in French). 12 (2070): 1804–1812.
- Duval, Noël (1972). "Études d'architecture chrétienne nord-africaine". Mélanges de l'École française de Rome (in French). 84–2 (2): 1071–1172. doi:10.3406/mefr.1972.939.
- Duval, Noël; Lézine, Alexandre (1959a). "Nécropole chrétienne et baptistère souterrain à Carthage". Cahiers archéologiques (in French). 10: 71–147. ISSN 0068-4945.
- Stevens, Susan (1995). "Sépultures tardives intra-muros à Carthage". L'Afrique du Nord antique et médiévale : monuments funéraires, institutions autochtones : VI^{e} colloque international sur l'histoire et l'archéologie de l'Afrique du Nord (Pau, octobre 1993) (in French). Paris: Comité des travaux historiques et scientifiques. pp. 207–218. OCLC 1158409539.

=== Works on the chapel ===
- Duval, Noël; Lézine, Alexander (1959b). "La chapelle funéraire souterraine dite d'Astérius, à Carthage". Mélanges de l'École française de Rome (in French). 71: 339–357.
