= Jehan Desanges =

French historian (1929–2021)

Jehan Desanges (3 January 1929 – 23 March 2021) was a French historian, philologist and epigrapher, a specialist in the topic of North Africa during Antiquity.

== Biography ==
Desanges was born in Nantes. He graduated in 1953, and was a lecturer at the École des hautes études in Tunis from 1958 to 1959. He was chef de travaux, then assistant professor of ancient history at the University of Dakar between 1959 and 1963. He was in charge of teaching in ancient history at the University of Algiers between 1963 and 1964 and at University of Nantes between 1964 and 1976, before becoming a senior lecturer after the defense of his thesis in 1976. From 1983 to 2001, he was director of studies at École pratique des hautes études, VI Section, then director of pensioned studies.

Member, then President, of Comité des travaux historiques et scientifiques, member of Société des Antiquaires de France, former head of the Interuniversity Network of Studies on Ancient North Africa and Medieval Islam. A former member of the National Council of Universities, the Scientific Council and the Board of Trustees of the French School of Rome, of the Scientific Council of Institut Français d'Archéologie Orientale. He was also a member, then president, of the scientific council of Aouras magazine, member of the Scientific Council and the Editorial Board of the Encyclopédie berbère as well as of the Editorial Board of the Graeco-Arabica series (Athens).

A member of the Institute for Advanced Study in Princeton, Jehan Desanges was a Research Fellow at Princeton University then visiting Fellow at the University of Cincinnati in 2004. A corresponding member of the Académie des Inscriptions et Belles-Lettres from 2000 onwards, he was elected a full member on 4 May 2012 in the seat formerly held by Claude Nicolet. He died in Paris, aged 92.

== Honours ==
Ribbon bar	Country	Honour
	France	Chevalier of the Legion of Honour
	France	Officier of the National Order of Merit
	France	Commander of the Ordre des Palmes Académiques

== Main publications ==
- 1962: Catalogue Des tribus africaines de l'Antiquité classique à l'ouest du Nil, éd. Publications de la section d'histoire de l'université de Dakar
- 1978: Recherches sur l'activité des Méditerranéens aux confins de l'Afrique (VIe siècle avant J-C. – IVe siècle après J.-C.), éd. Collection de l'École française de Rome
- 1980: Pline l'Ancien, histoire naturelle, 1-46 (L'Afrique du Nord), texte établi, traduit et commenté, éd. Les Belles Lettres, Paris
- 1988: Les Routes millénaires (in collaboration with M. Mollat du Jourdin), éd. Nathan, Paris
- 1993: Sur les routes antiques de l’Azanie et de l’Inde. Le Fonds Révoil du musée de l'Homme (Heïs et Damo, en Somalie) (in collaboration with E.M. Stern and P. Ballet), éd. l'Académie des inscriptions et belles-lettres, nouvelle série, XIII, Paris
- 1999: Toujours Afrique apporte fait nouveau. Scripta minora, éd. Boccard, Paris
- 2008: Pline l’Ancien, histoire naturelle, Livre VI, 4e partie (L’Asie africaine sauf l’Égypte, les dimensions et les climats du monde habité), texte établi, traduit et commenté, éd. Les Belles Lettres, Paris
- 2010: La Nouvelle Carte des voies romaines de l’Est de l’Africa dans l’Antiquité tardive d’après les travaux de P. Salama (Direction with Claude Lepelley and Noël Duval), éd. Brepols, Turnhout
