= Yvette Duval =

Moroccan-born French historian

- Yvette Duval with her husband Noël
- Born: Yvette Benchettrit; 25 April 1931; Oujda, Morocco
- Died: 8 November 2006 (aged 75); Paris, France
- Occupation: Historian
- Spouse: Noël Duval (m. 1954)

Academic background
- Thesis: [Loca sanctorum Africae. Le culte des martyrs en Afrique du IVe au VIIe siècle] (1977 =)

Academic work
- Discipline: Classics; history
- Institutions: Paris-Est Créteil University
- Main interests: Early African church; Late Antiquity

Yvette Duval (née Benchettrit; 25 April 1931 – 8 November 2006) was a Moroccan-born French historian who specialised in North Africa during Antiquity and the Early African church during Late antiquity.

== Early years and education ==
Yvette Duval née Benchettrit was born on 25 April 1931 in Oujda to an Algerian-Moroccan Jewish family. She was allowed to study at the local Collège de jeunes filles despite the Vichy segregation rules due to her strong academic record. Having finished her studies in Rabat, she moved to Paris where she studied first at the Lycée Fénelon and then at the École normale supérieure de jeunes filles. After her graduation, she worked at the Lycée Français de Carthage.

== Career ==
In 1962, Duval was named assistant to Roger Rémondon, the chair of ancient history at the Université Lille III. Two years later, following his retirement, she moved to Paris-Nanterre as the assistant to André Chastagnol.

Duval began work on her thesis in 1965 under Henri-Irénée Marrou and received her doctorate soon after his death in 1977 under the supervision of Charles Pietri; it was published five years later as Loca sanctorum Africae. Le culte des martyrs en Afrique du IVe au VIIe siècle.

In 1971, she was invited to help establish the History department at the Université Paris-Est-Créteil-Val-de-Marne where she was soon named professor. She remained until her retirement and was elected to serve on the Conseil national des universités and supervised at least three doctoral theses.

== Awards and honours ==
In 2000, she received a Festschrift titled Romanité et cité chrétienne permanences et mutations, intégration et exclusion du Ier au VIe siècle: mélanges en l'honneur d'Yvette Duval.

== Personal life ==
Duval married French historian and archaeologist Noël Duval in 1954. She died on 8 November 2006 in Paris.

== Selected publications ==
- 1982 : Loca sanctorum Africae. Le culte des martyrs en Afrique du IV^{e} au VII^{e} siècle, Rome, Collection de l'École française de Rome, 2 vol.
- 1986 : L'Inhumation privilégiée du IVe au VIIIe siècle en Occident [ed.], Paris, De Boccard.
- 1986 : Topographie chrétienne des cités de la Gaule, des origines au milieu du VIIIe siècle : Provinces ecclésiastiques d'Aix et d'Embrun [ed.], Paris, De Boccard.
- 1988 : Auprès des saints, corps et âme. L'inhumation « ad sanctos » dans la chrétienté d'Orient et d'Occident du IIIe au VIIe siècle, Paris, Collection des Études Augustiniennes.
- 1992 : Institutions, société et vie politique dans l'empire romain au IVe siècle après J.-C. [ed.], Rome, Collection de l'École française de Rome.
- 1995 : Lambèse chrétienne, la gloire et l'oubli. De la Numidie romaine à l'Ifrîqiya, Paris, Collection des Études Augustiniennes.
- 2000 : Chrétiens d’Afrique à l'aube de la paix constantinienne : Les premiers échos de la grande persécution, Paris, Collection des Études Augustiniennes.
- 2005 : Les chrétientés d’Occident et leurs évêques au IIIe siècle, Paris, Collection des Études Augustiniennes.
