= Claude Lepelley =

French historian

- Born: 8 February 1934; Saint-Maurice, Val-de-Marne
- Died: 31 January 2015 (aged 80); Montreuil, Seine-Saint-Denis
- Occupation(s): Historian; University

Claude Lepelley (8 February 1934 – 31 January 2015) was a 20th-21st-century French historian, a specialist of late Antiquity and North Africa during Antiquity. His thesis, Les cités de l'Afrique romaine au Bas-Empire, defended in 1977 under the direction of William Seston, profoundly changed the understanding of the urban world in the 3rd and 4th centuries; far from declining, the cities of Africa had some prosperity.

== Career ==
After his secondary education at lycée Charlemagne, he was received at the 1957 agrégation of history in 1957 and appointed to the University of Tunis between 1957 and 1959 before he did his military service in Algeria between November 1959 and January 1962. In Algiers, in particular, he was responsible for school education and participated in the development of a first handbook. Meanwhile, he took a stand against the Organisation armée secrète and wrote and distributed leaflets denouncing the abuses in the place to Le Canard Enchainé, which published his testimony.

Back in France, he was an assistant at the Faculté des lettres de Paris (1962–1967), maître de conférences at the University of Amiens (1967–1970) and the University of Lille III and a professor after he defended his thesis in 1977. He was professor and later emeritus professor at Paris West University Nanterre La Défense.

President of the "Institut des études augustiniennes" between 1987 and 2000, he was also responsible for the 'Centre de recherches sur l’Antiquité tardive et le Haut Moyen-Âge'. He actively contributed to the creation of the Maison Archéologie & Ethnologie René-Ginouvès inaugurated in 1998.

A member of the Comité des travaux historiques et scientifiques (Cths) in 1982, before becoming its secretary in 1992, a member of the Société des Antiquaires de France of which he was president in 2003 and president of the "Société française d’études épigraphiques sur Rome et le monde romain", Claude Lepelley was also publishing director of the series "Nouvelle Clio" from 1992 to 2008.

His research focused on the history of christianity and late Antiquity.

== Works ==
- 1969: L'empire romain et le christianisme, Groupe Flammarion, Questions d'histoire
- 1973: (eds.) : Christianisme et pouvoirs politiques, Lille, Presses Universitaires de Lille
- 1979: Les cités de l'Afrique romaine au Bas-Empire, tome I : La permanence d'une civilisation municipale, Institut des études augustiniennes, collection des études augustiniennes
- 1981: Les cités de l'Afrique romaine au Bas-Empire, tome II : Notices d'histoire municipale, Institut des études augustiniennes, collection des études augustiniennes
- 1983 : (eds.) : Les Lettres de saint Augustin découvertes par Johannes Divjak (communications présentées au colloque des 20 et 21 septembre 1982), Institut des études augustiniennes
- 1993: (eds. with P. Veyriras) : Newman et l'histoire, Presses Universitaires de Lyon
- 1996: (eds. with A. Chastagnol & S. Demougin) : « Splendissima civitas ». Études d'histoire romaine à la mémoire de François Jacques, Publications de la Sorbonne
- 1996: (dir.) : La fin de la cité antique et le début de la cité médiévale de la fin du IIIe à l'avènement de Charlemagne, Bari, Edipuglia, 1996.
- 1998: (dir.) : Rome et l'intégration de l'empire. Tome II : Approches régionales de Haut-Empire romain, Paris, PUF, Nouvelle Clio
- 2000: (eds. with X. Dupuis) : Frontières et limites géographiques de l'Afrique du Nord antique : hommage à Pierre Salama, Publications de la Sorbonne
- 2001: Aspects de l'Afrique romaine. Les cités, la vie rurale, le christianisme, Bari, Edipuglia, collection ofarticles.
- 2001: Les chrétiens et l'Empire romain : persécutions, polémique et apologétique, chapter VIII of Histoire du christianisme, Paris, Desclée de Brouwer
- 2004: « Une inscription d'Heraclea Sintica (Macédoine) récemment découverte, révélant un rescrit de l'empereur Galère restituant ses droits à la cite », Zeitschrift für Papyrologie und Epigraphik, 146
- 2007: « Saint Augustin et le rayonnement de sa pensée », chapitre VI de l'Histoire du christianisme, Paris, Le Seuil.
- 2010: Saint Augustin : le passeur des deux rives, Éditions d'Orbestier, collective work. This book brings together the endeavour of the leading specialists in Saint Augustine, including Claude Lepelley, and follows a symposium held in 2003 at Les Sables-d'Olonne with the support of Unesco in the context of the Year of Algeria in France.
- 2010: (dir.) : La nouvelle Carte des voies romaines de l’Est de l’Africa dans l’Antiquité Tardive d’après les travaux de P. Salama (Direction with Noël Duval and Jehan Desanges), Turnhout, Brepols

== Bibliography ==
- Inglebert (Hervé), éd., Idéologies et valeurs civiques dans le monde romain : hommage à Claude Lepelley, Paris, Picard, 2002. Un volume d'hommages; includes a detailed bibliography of Claude Lepelley.
