= Alexandre Lézine =

French architect and archaeologist (born 1906)

- Born: 4 July 1906; Moscow
- Died: 4 March 1972 (aged 65); Rome

Academic work
- Discipline: History, archaeology, architecture

Alexandre Lézine (born 4 July 1906 - 4 March 1972) was a French architect, historian and archaeologist of Russian origin.

== Career ==
Lézine graduated with a degree in archeology in 1937. He was the main architect of the historical monuments of Tunisia. As a historian and archaeologist, he published numerous works on ancient monuments and monuments of the Muslim period, taking an interest in the ancient palaces of Cairo.

From 1945 to 1951 Lézine participated in Pierre Montet's mission in Tanis. In the 1950s, he participated in the excavation of Carthage. His activity there was mainly focused on the excavation and restoration of the Antonine baths with Noël Duval and Gilbert Charles-Picard. Excavation of the old Évreux and restoration of the monuments of the Eure.

In 1949 he was named Architecte des Bâtiments de France, a French title for senior civil servants belonging to the body of state architects and urban planners focusing on heritage monuments. Between 1950 and 1964 he worked as an architect at the Tunisian Department of Antiquities, including in 1952 as principal architect of the Historical Monuments of Tunisia. From 1957 to 1964, he was appointed as advisor to the Tunisian government at the Department of Antiquities and Art; he also lectured on Islamic architecture at the University of Tunis. He served as the Director of the Service of Historical Monuments of Tunisia between 1950 and 1956. From 1957 to 1972 he was Senior Research Fellow at the French National Centre for Scientific Research (CNRS). Lézine was appointed Master of Research at the CNRS in 1957, and was an honorary member of the French Académie des Inscriptions et Belles-Lettres from 1962 until his death in 1972. In 1962 he was appointed UNESCO expert in Afghanistan where he was responsible for inspection and restoration of monuments.

Lézine was decorated with the Croix de Guerre 1939–1945.

== Publications ==
- En collaboration avec J. Verrier, Notes sur la consolidation des monuments historiques de Tunisie, Tunis, Direction des antiquités et arts de Tunisie, 1953.
- Le ribat de Sousse, suivi de notes sur le ribat de Monastir, Tunis, Direction des antiquités et arts de Tunisie, Notes et documents, t. XIV, 1956.
- Architecture romaine d'Afrique : Recherches et mises au point, Paris, PUF, 1961.
- Mahdiya, recherches d'archéologie islamique, Paris, Klinksieck, 1965.
- Architecture de l'Ifriqiya, recherches sur les monuments aghlabides, Paris, Klinksieck, 1966.
- Carthage. Utique - Études d'architecture et d'urbanisme, Paris, éd. du CNRS, 1968.
- Mahdiya, Tunis, Société tunisienne de diffusion, 1968.
- Sousse, les monuments musulmans, Tunis, Cérès Productions, 1968.
- Thuburbo Majus, Tunis, Société tunisienne de diffusion, 1968.
- Les thermes d'Antonin à Carthage, Tunis, Société tunisienne de diffusion, 1969.
- Utique, Tunis, Société tunisienne de diffusion, 1970.
- Trois palais d'époque ottomane au Caire, Le Caire, Institut français d’archéologie orientale, 1972.

== See also ==
Alexandre Lézine (1906-1972) Biography
