= Noël Duval =

French archaeologist (1929–2018)

Noël Duval (24 December 1929, Le Chesnay – 12 December 2018, Paris) was a French archaeologist.

== Biography ==
In 1953 Duval started working as a researcher and for three consecutive years worked at the Roman Historical Institute. He was a member of French National Centre for Scientific Research, École du Louvre and worked at the University of Nantes, Lille and Fribourg in Switzerland. In 1960 he became interested in both Hispanic and Catalan archaeology and by 1976 he became a professor at Paris-Sorbonne University where he taught Late Antiquity and Byzantinian Art in Middle Ages. He worked there until 1992 and then became a member of Reial Acadèmia de Bones Lletres in Barcelona, Spain. Since 1990, he focused himself on Augustan History and by 1994 he was awarded an honorary doctorate from the University of Geneva. Later in his career he taught archaeology at the Autonomous University of Barcelona. Duval was elected as an emeritis professor fellow at the University of Paris in 2007.

Duval married historian Yvette Duval in 1954.

== Honours and awards ==
=== Honours ===
- Knight of the Legion of Honour (France)
- Officier of the National Order of Merit (France)
- Commander of the Ordre des Palmes Académiques (France)
- Gold Medal of the city of Split (Croatia)
- Medal of the city of Sremska Mitrovica (Serbia)

=== Awards ===
- CNRS Silver Medal
- CNRS Bronze Medal
- Bronze and Silver Medals of the Académie d'architecture
- Prize of the Académie des Inscriptions et Belles-Lettres
- Frend Medal of Christian Archeology of the Society of Antiquaries of London

=== Acknowledgement ===
- Member of the Pontifical Academy of Archaeology
- Member of the Serbian Academy of Sciences and Arts
- Member of the Royal Academy of Sciences and Arts of Barcelona
- Member of the German Archaeological Institute
- Member of the Society of Antiquaries of London
- Associate Member of the British Academy

=== Honorary degrees ===
- 1994 : University of Geneva
- 2000 : Autonomous University of Barcelona

== Main publications ==
- Les églises africaines à deux absides, 2 vols, Rome, CEFR, 1971 and 1973
- Les ruines de Sufetula-Sbeitla (with F. Baratte), Tunis, éd. STD, 1973
- Haïdra, les ruines d'Ammaedara (with F. Baratte), Tunis, éd. STD, 1974
- Haïdra I. Les inscriptions chrétiennes d'Haïdra (with F. Prévot), Rome, CEFR, 1975
- Catalogue des mosaïques romaines et paléochrétiennes du Musée du Louvre (with F. Baratte), Rome, CEFR, 1978
- Sirmium VII et VIII (Direction with V. Popovic), Rome, CEFR, 1977 and 1978
- Catalogue des mosaïques romaines et paléochrétiennes du Musée du Louvre (with F. Baratte), Paris, Réunions des musées nationaux, 1978
- Haïdra II, L'église I dite de Melléus [under the direction], Rome, CEFR, 1981
- Inventaire des basiliques chrétiennes d'Afrique du Nord : Inventaire des monuments de l'Algérie, 2 vols (with Isabelle Gui et Jean-Pierre Caillet), Paris, Collection des Études augustiniennes, 1992
- Salona I, recherches archéologiques franco-croates à Salone [under the direction], Rome, CEFR, 1994
- Les premiers monuments chrétiens de la France, Paris, Éditions A et J Picard, 1995
- Les premiers monuments chrétiens de la France II, Paris, Éditions A and J Picard, 1996
- Salona II, Rome, CEFR, 1996
- Les premiers monuments chrétiens de la France III, Paris, Éditions A and J Picard, 1998
- Les mosaïques funéraires d'une église de Pupput (with Aïcha Ben Abed), Paris, CNRS, 1998
- Salona III, Rome, CEFR, 2000
- L'Historiae Augustae Colloquium I de la nouvelle série, (with G. Bonamente), Bari, Edipuglia, 2000
- Actes de la journée d'études sur les églises de Jordanie et leurs mosaïques [under the direction], Beirut, Institut français du Proche-Orient, 200313
- Haïdra IV, L'église de Candidus ou des martyrs de la persécution de Dioclétien (co-edition with F. Baratte), Rome, CEFR, 2010
- La nouvelle Carte des voies romaines de l'Est de l'Africa dans l'Antiquité Tardive d'après les travaux de P. Salama (Direction with Claude Lepelley and Jehan Desanges), Turnhout, Brepols, 2010
- Caričin Grad III. L'Acropole et ses monuments [under the direction], Rome, CEFR, 2010
- Salona IV : Recherches archéologiques franco-croates à Salone, Inscriptions de Salone chrétienne, IVe-VIIe siècles (vol. I et II), (with Emilio Marin, Jean-Pierre Caillet, Denis Feissel, Nancy Gauthier et Françoise Prévot), Rome, CEFR, 2010
- Basiliques chrétiennes d'Afrique du Nord. II, Monuments de la Tunisie (with François Baratte & Fathi Bejaoui), Bordeaux, Ausonius, 2015

== See also ==
- Asterius chapel
