= Liliane Ennabli =

French archaeologist, historian and epigrapher

Liliane Ennabli is a Franco-Tunisian historian, archaeologist and epigrapher, a specialist in the history of the Christian period of the archaeological site of Carthage.

Research Fellow at the Centre national de la recherche scientifique (CNRS) and centre de recherches Tenain de Villemont on Early Christianity and late Antiquity at the Université Paris-Sorbonne, she conducted excavations of Christian monuments as part of the international campaign of UNESCO intended to save the ancient city (1972–1992), the basilica of Carthagenna and the monastery of Bigua. She published the corpus of Christian inscriptions from Carthage.

She is married to Abdelmajid Ennabli, former curator of the archaeological site and the Carthage National Museum.

== Publications ==
- 1975: Les inscriptions funéraires chrétiennes de Carthage, éd. École française de Rome
- 1997: Carthage, une métropole chrétienne du IVe à la fin du VIIe siècle, coll. Études d'antiquités africaines, éd. du CNRS, Paris
- 2000: Catalogue des inscriptions chrétiennes sur pierre du musée du Bardo, éd. Institut national du patrimoine, Tunis
- 2000: La basilique de Carthagenna et le locus des sept moines de Gafsa. Nouveaux édifices chrétiens de Carthage, vol. I, coll. Études d'antiquités africaines, éd. du CNRS, Paris, (read online)
- 2000: Carthage : actualités des fouilles dans le domaine paléochrétien, Antiquités africaines, vol. 36, n°1, 2000, pp. 161–183 (read online)
