= Basilica of Saint-Cyprien =

Christian temple

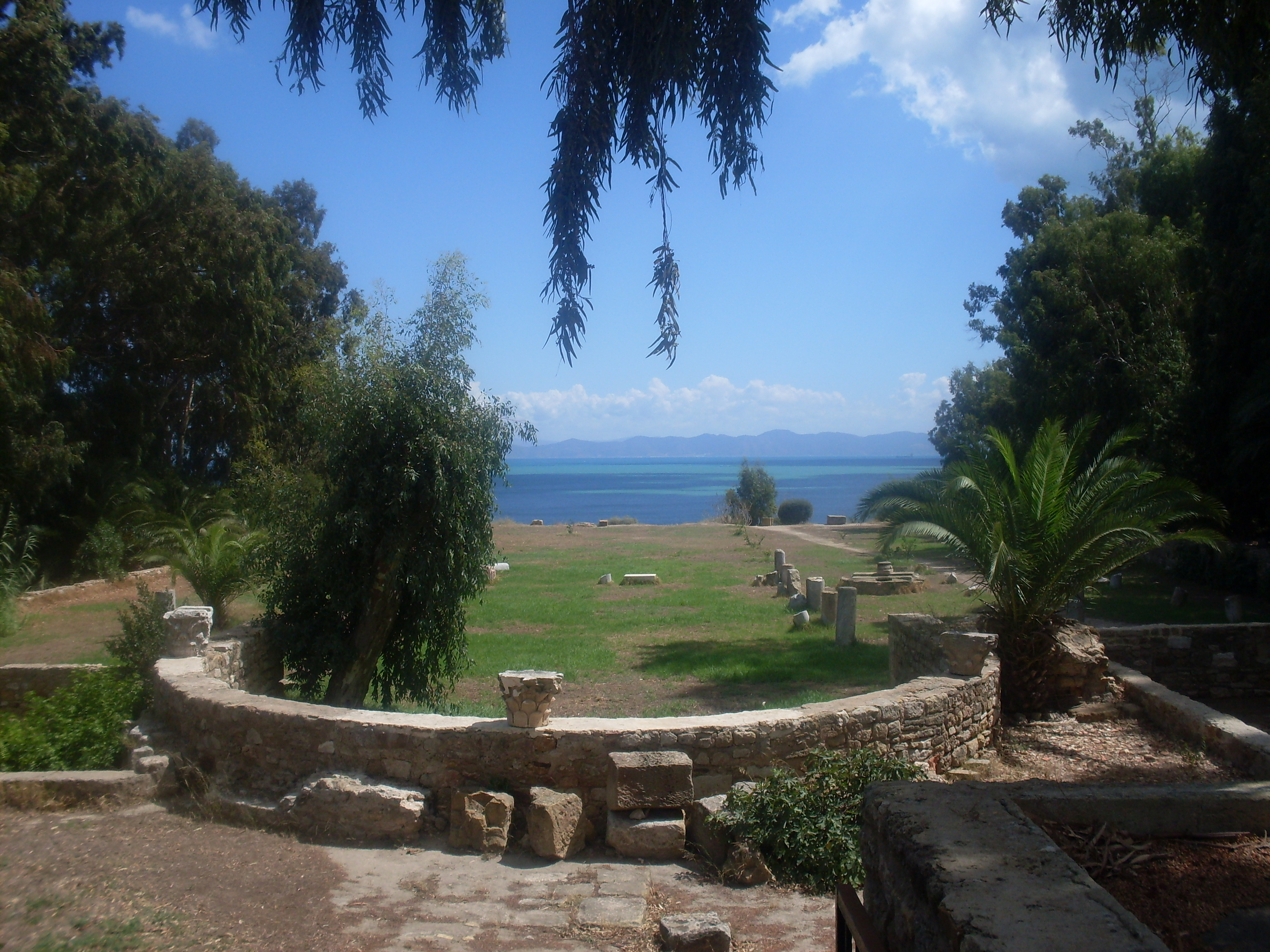
- Ruins of the basilica of Saint-Cyprien.
- Interactive map of the Basilica of Saint-Cyprien area

General information
- Type: Religious basilica
- Location: Carthage, Tunisia
- Coordinates: 36°51′50″N 10°20′16″E

The Basilica of Saint-Cyprien, also known as Basilica near Sainte-Monique, is a ruined Christian temple located on the edge of the Tunisian archaeological site of Carthage, on the Bordj Djedid plateau and the seafront.

The Christian basilicas of Carthage were excavated by the White Fathers from the 1880s onwards. The largest is the Basilica of Damous El Karita, discovered in 1878 by Father Alfred Louis Delattre. The Basilica of Saint-Cyprien, mostly attributed to Saint Cyprian, was found in 1915 by Father Delattre during his last excavation campaign. The site was explored according to the practices in use at the time. The current remains are meager and difficult to interpret, due to untimely interventions at the 1930 Carthage Eucharistic congress.

The building enjoys a panoramic view over the Gulf of Tunis and the Djebel Boukornine and has been identified by literary sources as the edifice dedicated to Saint Cyprian, who died on September 14, 258 during the persecution of Valerian. This identification, proposed at the time of the excavations, has been confirmed by most researchers, including Charles Saumagne, based on ancient texts. However, the absence of epigraphic sources to formally confirm the identification raises questions.

The building whose ruins were excavated in the 20th century was the successor to a construction dating from the end of the 4th century, and was in use throughout Late antiquity, including the Vandal period and into the 6th century. The building and adjacent cemetery were probably in use until the Arab-Muslim conquest of 698.

== Location ==
The building is located on the outskirts of the Carthage archaeological site, in a suburb of the city, as it is not aligned with either the urban organization or the rural cadastration. The site known as "Tears of Saint Monica" is located near the sea. It is located near a thirty-meter gully overlooking the sea, on a site that has probably long been dedicated to the safety of sailors, and of great beauty.

== Issue of Cyprian basilicas ==
The inquiries of basilicas dedicated to Saint Cyprian have often been raised by historians working on African Christianity, in particular Auguste Audollent, Charles Saumagne, Serge Lancel, and Liliane Ennabli.

In 1901, Paul Monceaux referred to the disagreement between historians "on the number and location of basilicas". Victor de Vite locates two Cyprian basilicas outside the city walls of Carthage, the place of his martyrdom and the place of his burial at "Les Mappales". Monceaux considered that three buildings were dedicated to the saint in Carthage, two outside the city (Ager Sexti towards La Marsa, and the other near the cisterns of La Malga) and one near the Punic ports, a thesis contested by most specialists, including Lancel. Texts by Augustine of Hippo, in particular his sermons, support the idea of two buildings dedicated to the bishop of Carthage.

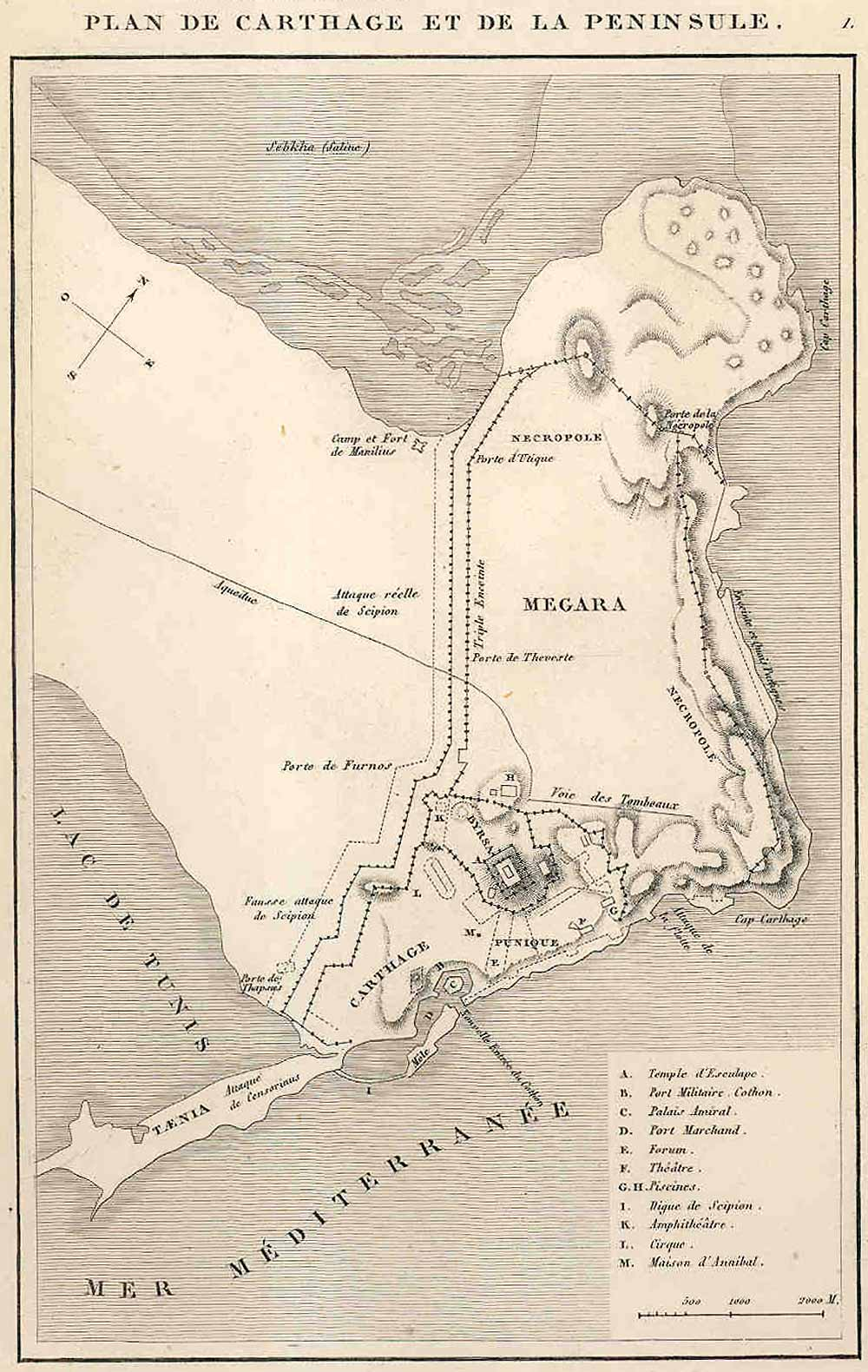
Location of the suburb of Megara on an 1844 map.

Cyprian was brought before the proconsul to a place known as the "estate of Sextus", reputed for its salubrity, where he was executed the following day in a secret location. The location is not "yet certain", but a basilica was built there. It may have been located in the suburb of Megara, in a particularly wooded area, perhaps in the direction of La Marsa. In his sermons, Augustine repeatedly refers to Cyprian's two altars, one of which was designed to hold offerings (known as the mensa), the need for the faithful to make donations, and the construction of a church in which services were held. This suggests that the martyrdom site was already under construction in Augustine's time, and was therefore modest, like a simple apse according to Ennabli. The place of martyrdom undoubtedly possessed some of the saint's relics, such as his vestments.

After his martyrdom, Cyprian's body was brought by the faithful at night and buried in a place called Area Macrobi Candidati, not far from the pools and the palace. The Mappales building is mentioned in Augustine's account of a miracle involving a wealthy Carthaginian woman, Megetia, who fulfilled a vow to Saint Cyprian. For a long time, and even as late as the end of the 4th century, the site only had a chapel.

Procopius of Caesarea, in his account of the arrival of the Byzantines in Carthage, refers to a Cyprian edifice located "in front of the city, by the sea". A sermon by Augustine of Mainz 5 refers to the Mappales building "near the memoria of the holy bishop and martyr". This building is also known as the Basilica Restituta. The identification of the building with the memoria of Saint Cyprian is probable "if we compare the texts and the monument found". This identification was accepted as early as Charles Saumagne.

== History ==
=== Ancient history ===
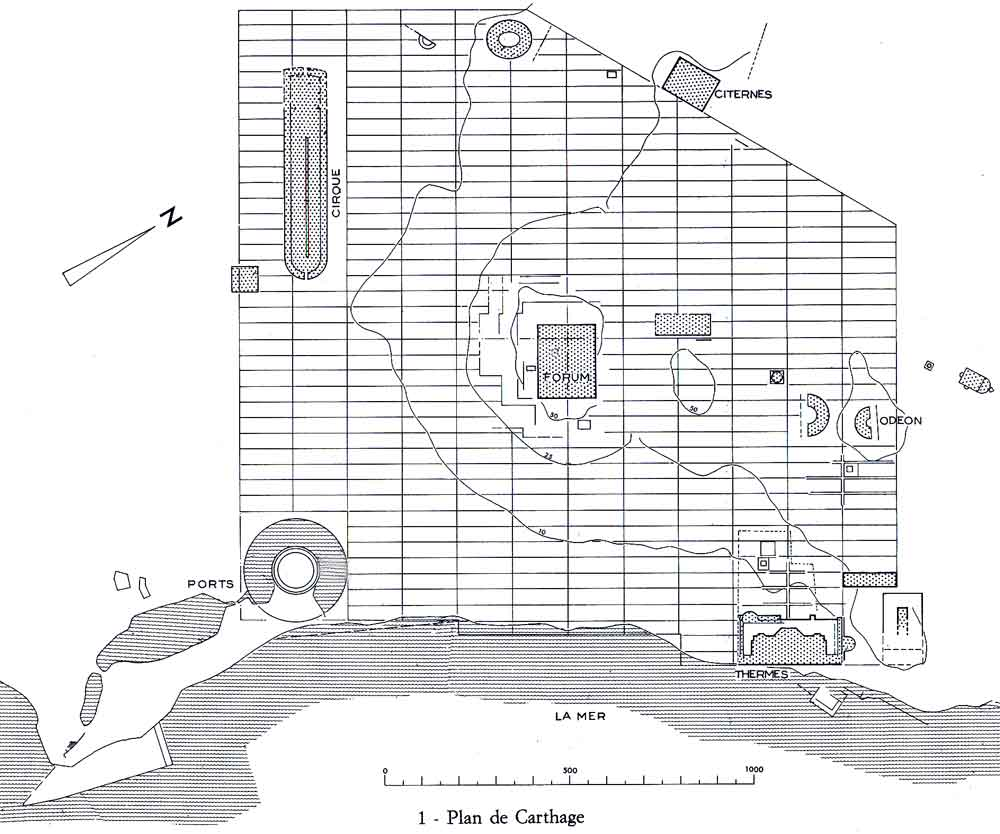
Map of Roman Carthage with main monuments located: the basilica is outside the grid, on the right.

Christianity took root in Africa as early as the 1st and 2nd centuries, in the capital Carthage.

Excavations have uncovered a fragment of an inscription mentioning the divinity Securitas, which suggests that a pagan temple existed there before a Christian edifice replaced it. Seafarers had long sought divine protection, so the site was important for sailors seeking the fresh water found in the Dar Saniat basins.

Saint Cyprian, the first bishop of Carthage, was arrested on September 13, 258 by two officers accompanied by soldiers and executed by decapitation the following day. His body was transported near the shore and a basilica was built over his tomb at the end of the 4th century.

The cult of saints was very important in the African church, with relics often placed under the altar. Feasts, including singing and dancing, were held regularly within the sanctuaries, as in the memoria of Cyprian. This annual feast dedicated to Cyprian was called Cypriana and took place at both the martyrdom site and the saint's tomb; it was popular with sailors. The cult of Cyprian began fairly early in the fourth century, developing especially in Africa. A sermon by Augustine, dated August 401, mentions a scandal caused by people wanting to dance; subsequently, from September 401, vigils were set up to prevent such excesses and "keep the zithers away from this place", as Augustine put it, "the persistence of a pagan custom", according to the bishop of Hippo. It was a "complete success", as sources make no further mention of martyrdom-related outbursts.

Saint Monica, the mother of Saint Augustine, is said to have spent the night before Augustine departs for Italy, but in an earlier building, probably a chapel. In an extract from his Confessions, he describes the scene as having taken place in 383. Augustine gave sermons and homilies at the Mappales. In a text from 533, Procopius of Caesarea mentions "[the construction] in his honor, in front of the city, by the sea, [of] a prestigious temple "14. Victor de Vite mentions two churches dedicated to the saint at the end of the 5th century.

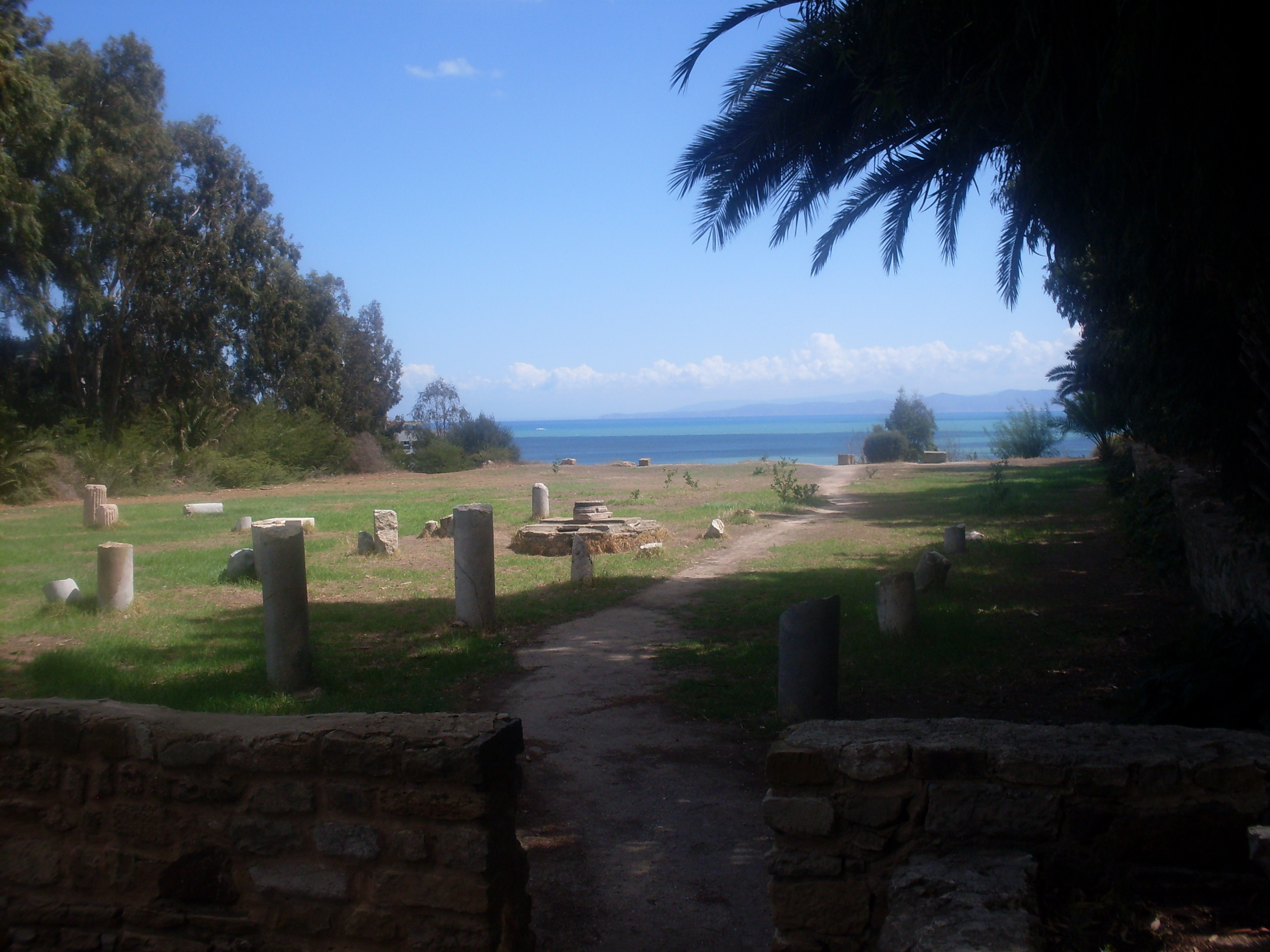
General view of the basilica.

The present building is sometimes mistakenly referred to as the "Basilica of Saint Monica" or the "Tears of Saint Monica". It was built at the end of the 4th century, with integrated elements of the former edifice, probably near a cemetery or area, perhaps belonging to the procurator Macrobius Candidatus, ceded for the deposition of the saint's body. The basilica would have contained the marble lectern mentioned by Gregory of Tours, "a masterpiece undoubtedly inspired by the genius of the martyr", no fragment of which was found during excavations by Father Alfred Louis Delattre.

The site was used as a cemetery before the construction of the building, as sarcophagi are located under the northeast wall. Burial as close as possible to the saints' graves is a classic practice, especially ad sanctos, as close as possible to the relics. These burials date from the end of the 4th century to the beginning of the 6th century.

The memory of the martyr is kept alive on the site, which could explain the building's long use from the end of the fourth century onwards, and the site was used even during the Vandal era, as a silver coin of the Vandal king Gunthamund was found by Delattre in a tomb. The occupation of the site by the Arian Vandals from the time of Genseric's capture of Carthage is attested by literary sources under Genseric and up to the reign of Gelimer, the church being taken over by the Catholics on September 14, 533. Work to solidify the structure was carried out at a later date. The remains of inscriptions reveal names of Germanic origin; one is dated 438, but the precise dating of the building is problematic. Numerous burials took place, for the deceased to obtain the saint's protection, from before the basilica was built until the beginning of the 6th century. With the Arab occupation of the site, Cyprian's tomb "disappeared from history".

=== Modern history and rediscovery of the site ===
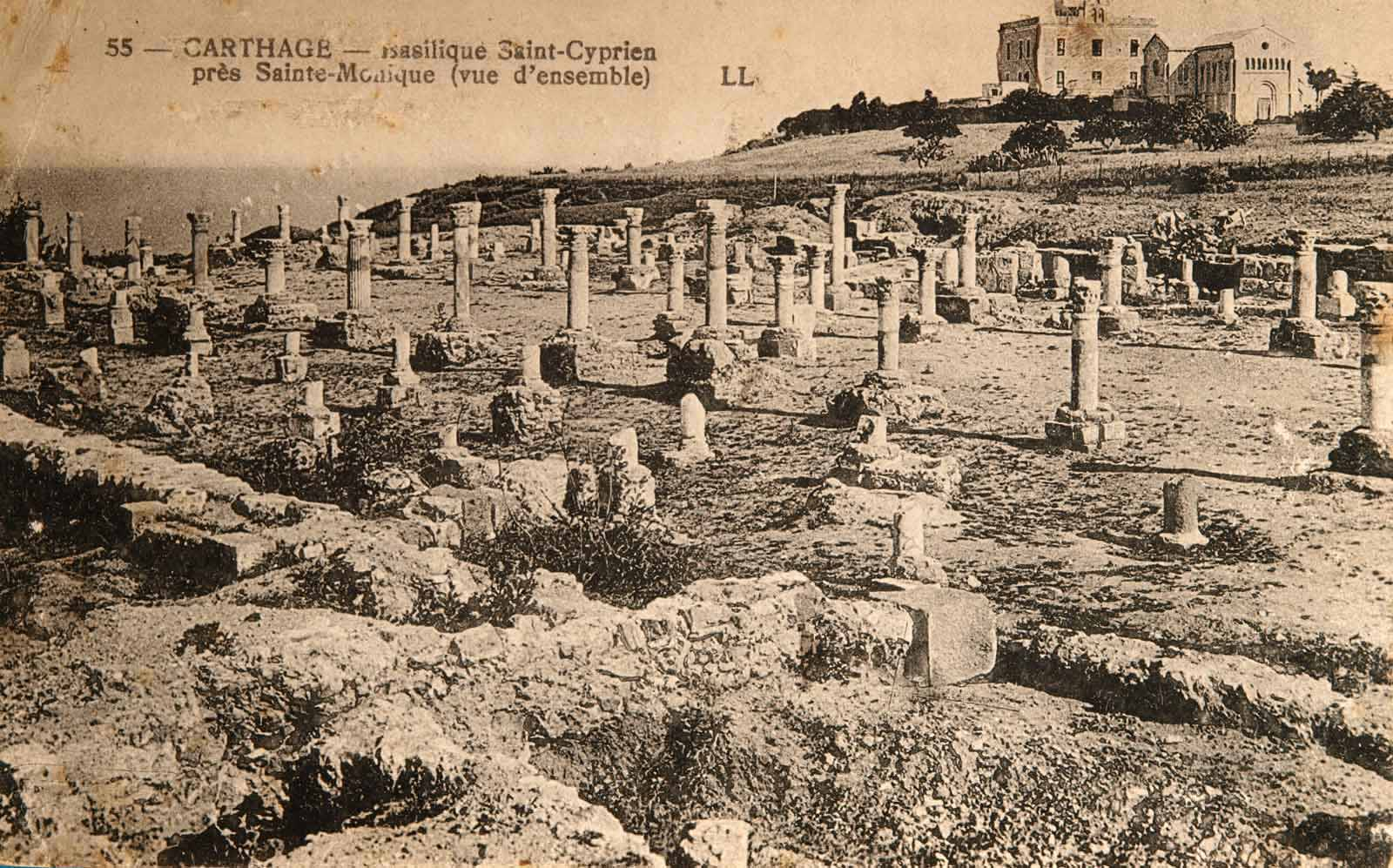
Antique postcard showing the ruins of the basilica.

During the Turkish occupation, a fort was built on the site of the basilica.

Research was carried out in the 19th century to locate the Basilica of Saint-Cyprien in the area. As the land belonged to the Archbishopric of Carthage, excavations went smoothly. Father Delattre searched for the burial site of the saint's body in the area of the La Malga cisterns in 1889.

Archaeological excavations on the Carthage site have uncovered more than a dozen Christian places of worship: at least 22 basilicas are known from a period of three centuries and 17 Christian buildings are known from the fifth century. These excavations were financed by the Académie des Inscriptions et Belles-Lettres.

A vast construction was discovered in 1915 and identified as the Basilica of Saint Cyprian, thanks to a text by Saint Augustine (or Procopius of Caesarea), who placed it "in front of the city, near the sea". According to Duval, this identification is "plausible without more, since no precise document has been found".

Inscriptions were pulled out of the ruins by residents before excavation, and this untimely clearing convinced them to carry out excavations on the site. The very modest remains were extensively excavated until 1920, with the removal of ancient flagstones and paving. The inscriptions found during the excavations were published in the 1920s. The site was restored on the occasion of the thirtieth Eucharistic congress held in Carthage in May 1930, with heterogeneous anastyloses of columns incorrectly placed above the foundations.

The buildings left after the excavations were stripped bare, as Delattre was preoccupied with obtaining inscriptions and items for display at the museum on Byrsa hill. The visit was disappointing for the public and specialists alike and villas now surround the remains. The numerous inscriptions collected by Delattre join the museum's collections. The site yielded some 10,000 inscriptions of varying interest, both in terms of religiosity and the onomastics present in Carthage at the time, with Vandal and Punic names.

Buildings behind the basilica were reported as unexcavated in 1950 by Gabriel-Guillaume Lapeyre and Arthur Pellegrin. The site was excavated again in 1967, and a new plan was drawn up to rectify Delattre's plan. However, this study was "rapid".

== Description of the building and current remains ==
=== General information ===
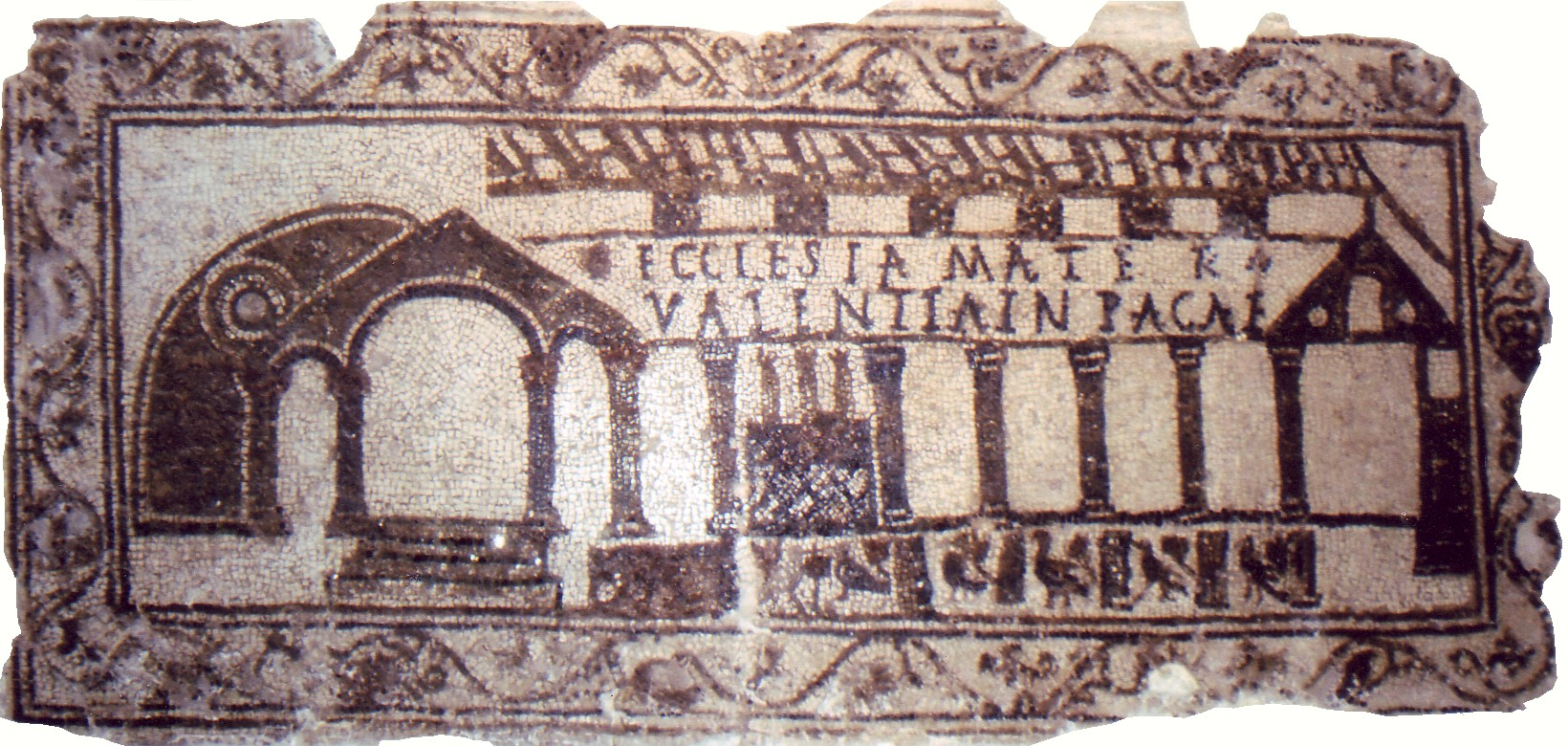
Early Christian basilica depicted on the Ecclesia Mater mosaic from Tabarka, now in the Bardo National Museum.

The basilica is a five-aisled edifice oriented to the west, The building's façade overlooked the Gulf of Tunis.

The monument was 81 meters long by 35,55 meters wide, for a total surface area of 2,500 square meters: it was divided between a building measuring 71,34 meters by 35,55 meters and an apse measuring 9,58 meters by 9,74 meters deep.

=== Plan ===
The construction is not coherent, and the plan surveyed by Father Delattre is unreliable. According to Lapeyre and Pellegrin, the general plan follows that of Syrian basilicas: quadratum populi (nave) with atrium and presbyterium, to which two sacristies were attached. Most African basilicas do not have an atrium, except the major buildings in the provincial capital.

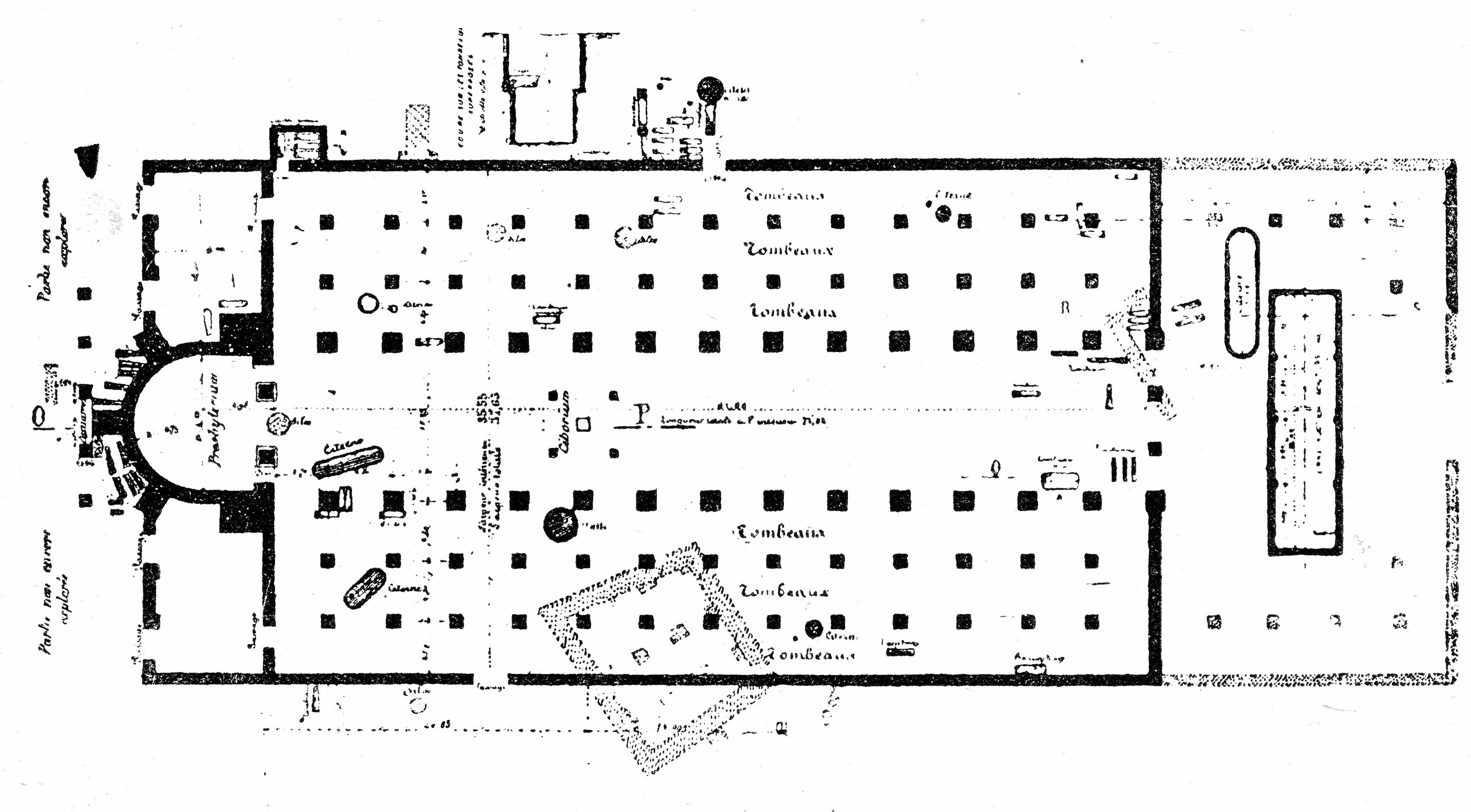
Plan according to ancient excavations.

The chevet may have been a reuse of an earlier construction, Delattre having noted that some walls sat on Christian sarcophagi.

The quadratum populi consisted of seven large naves and fourteen bays stretching 61,60 meters in length. An apse, raised above the nave and equipped with a staircase, was reinforced by five buttresses and closed the monument. A three-arched iconostasis separated the nave from the apse. The building had a wooden roof frame. The central nave was over eleven meters wide, and an altar with a ciborium was located between the ninth and tenth bays.

The location of the altar within the quadratum populi is typically African, the element being protected by an enclosure. Below the altar was the saint's tomb. According to Lapeyre and Pellegin, the columns and capitals were "quite disparate", having been reused from earlier buildings. The altar would have been made of wood.

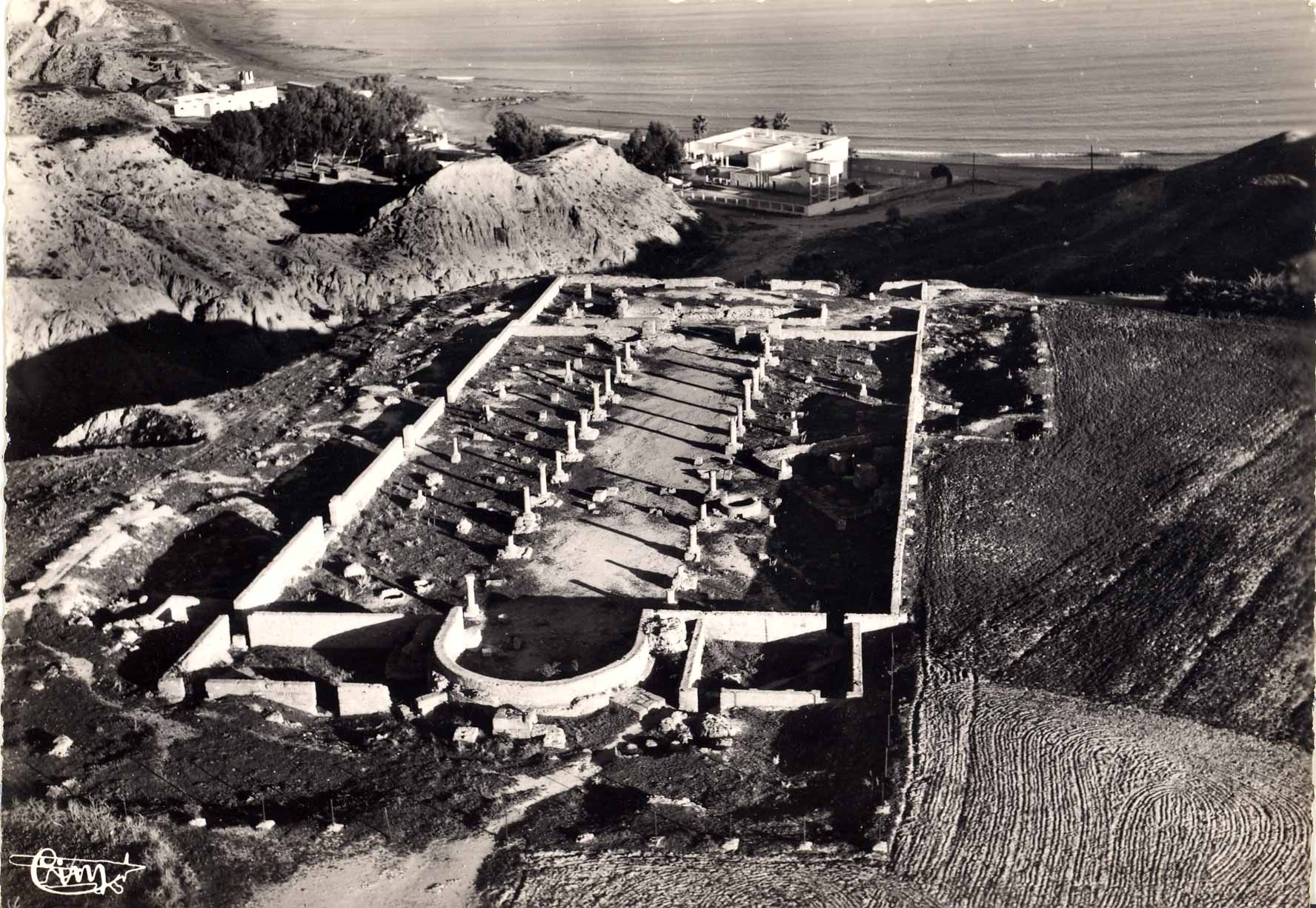
Aerial view of the basilica in the mid-20th century.

The building had an atrium with porticoes on three sides and cisterns, and perhaps a porch. The atrium contained numerous tombs. An underground room was also present. Despite the presence of paintings and a door, Noël Duval, unlike Delattre, considers this room to be a cistern. This cistern, measuring 18 by 4.25 meters and five meters deep, was later used as a dwelling. A second, smaller cistern was built when the main cistern was used as a dwelling, a well having also been found.

The presbytery was not linked to the sacristies. One of them, the draconian, was for clergymen, while the other (prosthesis) was for the faithful. The building had annexes, including a hall or chapel to the northeast and a gallery to the northwest. Duval believes that a second church with an apse was located to the northeast and that the complex belongs to the double basilica model, even if the disproportion is great but perhaps less so in the primitive configuration. Liliane Ennabli considers this annex to have been a meeting hall or church annex. Entrances provided access from the basilica to the annexes.

The monument was surrounded by a vast cemetery, some of whose tombs were decorated with mosaics. The interior of the church also housed numerous graves.

== See also ==
- Basilica of Damous El Karita

== Bibliography ==
- Audollent, Auguste (1901). Carthage romaine : 146 avant Jésus-Christ – 698 après Jésus-Christ (in French). Albert Fontemoing.
- Baratte, François; Béjaoui, Fathi; Duval, Noël; Berraho, Sarah; Gui, Isabelle; Jacquest, Hélène (2014). Basiliques chrétiennes d'Afrique du Nord. Inventaire des monuments de la Tunisie (in French). Ausonius. ISBN 978-2356131188.
- Beschaouch, Azedine (2001). La légende de Carthage (in French). Éditions Gallimard. ISBN 2-07-053212-7.
- Lapeyre, Gabriel-Guillaume; Pellegrin, Arthur (1950). Carthage latine et chrétienne (in French). Payot.
- Slim, Hédi; Fauqué, Nicolas (2001). La Tunisie antique : de Hannibal à saint Augustin (in French). Mengès. ISBN 2-85620-421-X.
- Slim, Hédi; Mahjoubi, Ammar; Belkhodja, Khaled; Ennabli, Abdelmajid (2003). Histoire générale de la Tunisie (in French). Vol. 1. Maisonneuve et Larose. ISBN 2-7068-1695-3.
- Briand-Ponsart, Claude; Hugoniot, Christophe (2005). L'Afrique romaine : de l'Atlantique à la Tripolitaine, 146 av. J.-C. - 533 apr. J.-C (in French). Armand Colin. ISBN 2-200-26838-6.
- Corbier, Paul; Griesheimer, Marc (2005). L'Afrique romaine : 146 av. J.-C. - 439 apr. J.-C (in French). Ellipses. ISBN 2-7298-2441-3.
- Duval, Noël (1991). "Basilique chrétienne africaine". Encyclopédie berbère (in French). Vol. 9. Édisud. ISBN 2-85744-509-1.
- Duval, Noël (1993). "Carthage". Encyclopédie berbère (in French). Vol. 12. Édisud. ISBN 2-85744-581-4.
- Duval, Noël (1972). "Études d'architecture chrétienne nord-africaine". Mélanges de l'École française de Rome: Antiquité (in French). 84 (2): 1071–1172. doi:10.3406/mefr.1972.939.
- Ennabli, Abdelmajid; Rebourg, Alain (1993). Carthage : le site archéologique (in French). Cérès. ISBN 9973-700-83-X.
- Ennabli, Abdelmajid; Fradier, Georges; Pérez, Jacques (1995). Carthage retrouvée (in French). Cérès Editions. ISBN 9973-19-055-6.
- Ennabli, Liliane (1997). Carthage, une métropole chrétienne du ive à la fin du viie siècle (in French). Centre national de la recherche scientifique. ISBN 2-271-05402-8.
- Ennabli, Liliane (2000). Carthage chrétienne (in French). Agence de mise en valeur du patrimoine et de promotion culturelle.
- Laronde, André; Golvin, Jean-Claude (2001). L'Afrique antique : histoire et monuments (in French). Taillandier. ISBN 2-235-02313-4.
- Le Bohec, Yann (2005). Histoire de l'Afrique romaine : 146 avant J.-C.-439 après J.-C (in French). Picard. ISBN 2-7084-0751-1.
- Picard, Colette (1951). Carthage (in French). Les Belles Lettres.
- Vaultrin, J. (1930). Les basiliques chrétiennes de Carthage : étude d'archéologie et d'histoire (in French). Société historique algérienne.
- Collectif (1995). La Carthage de Saint Augustin (in French). Connaissance des arts. ISSN 0293-9274.
- Collectif (1996). Carthage : l'histoire, sa trace et son écho (in French). Association française d'action artistique. ISBN 9973-22-026-9.
- Delattre, Alfred Louis (1916). Une grande basilique près de Sainte-Monique à Carthage (in French). Vol. 60. CRAI.
- Antoine, Héron de Villefosse (1915). Nouvelles des fouilles du R.P. Delattre à Carthage (in French). Vol. 59. CRAI.
- Ennabli (1975). Les inscriptions funéraires chrétiennes de la basilique dite de Sainte-Monique à Carthage (in French). Publications de l'École française de Rome.
- Monceaux, Paul (1901). Le tombeau et les basiliques de saint Cyprien à Carthage (in French). Revue africaine.
- Saumagne, Charles (1909). Les basiliques cypriennes (in French). Revue africaine.
- Collectif (1992). Pour sauver Carthage : exploration et conservation de la cité punique, romaine et byzantine (in French). Unesco/INAA. ISBN 92-3-202782-8.
