= Basilica of Damous El Karita =

Basilica in Tunisia

Coordinates: 36°51′41″N 10°19′52″E

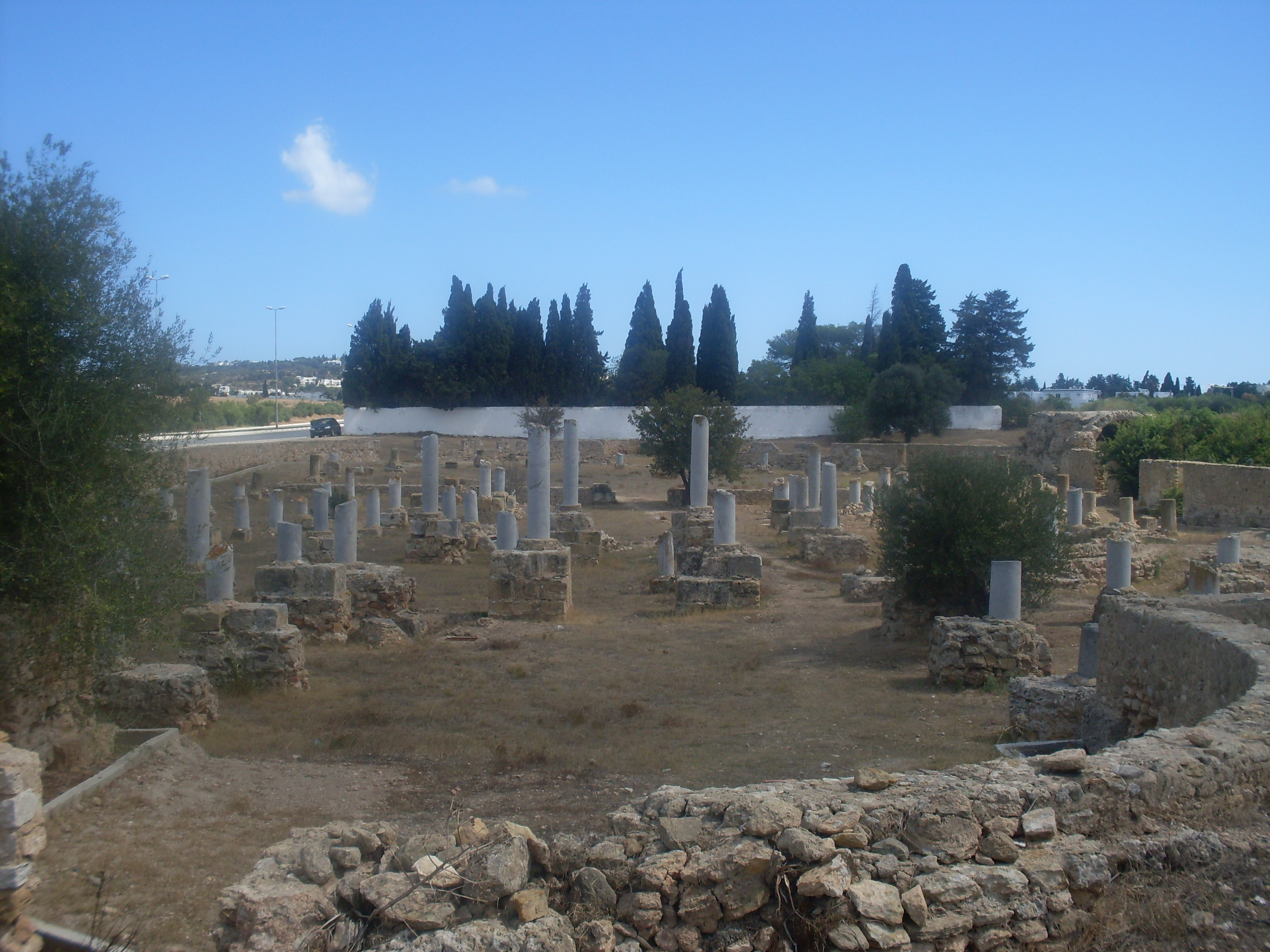
Ruins of Basilica of Damous El Karita west view

Localization of the basilica (4) and of the rotunda (5) in the general plan of the archaeological site of Carthage

The basilica of Damous El Karita is an ancient basilica, located in Carthage, in modern Tunisia, dating from the Late antiquity and the Byzantine epoch. It is situated nearby the Odeon hills within the archeological site of Carthage.

Most important and known Christian architectural complex within the capital of the Roman province of Africa, it is according to Noël Duval "one of the most important Christian monuments" but also "most abused and poorly known". The architectural complex, indeed was one of the most important architectural Christian cultural ensembles of North Africa from the late antiquity up to the late middle-ages. The entire ensemble was composed of 2 churches, at least one martyrium, several Hypogeums as well as a subterran rotunda with a complex interpretation.

The importance of the complex suggests that the place was not only a funerary center but also a major pilgrimage site linked to the cults of the saints buried in this place as well as of important religious festivals.

The identification of the basilica is complex but, following recent works, some authors accept the identification with a basilica known by literary sources as the basilica Fausti .

== Etymology ==
The current name of the basilica comes from a deformation of the Latin domus caritatis or "house of charity".

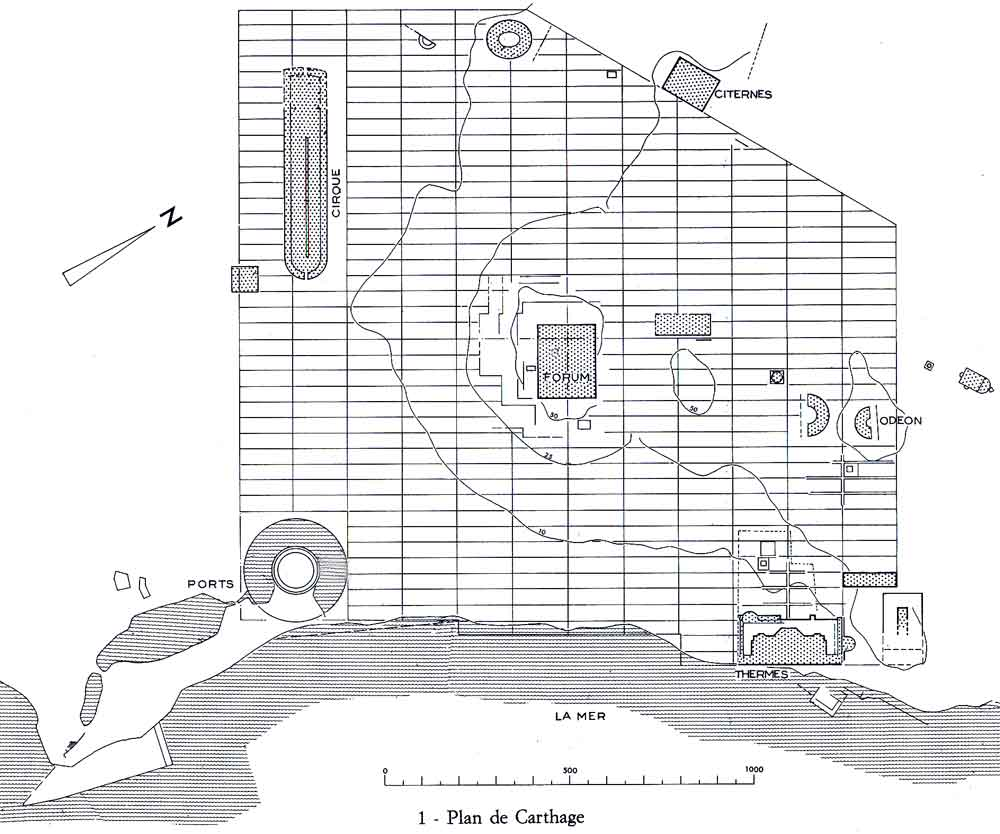
Map of Roman Carthage with the localization of the main buildings : the ensemble of the basilica and the rotunda of Damous El Karita is situated outside of the grid, to the right

== Plan ==
The ensemble as of the 1990s is still incompletely searched. The known surface of the complex is, however of 15000 m^{2} from which 2925 m^{2} constitutes the quadratum populi.

=== Basilica ===
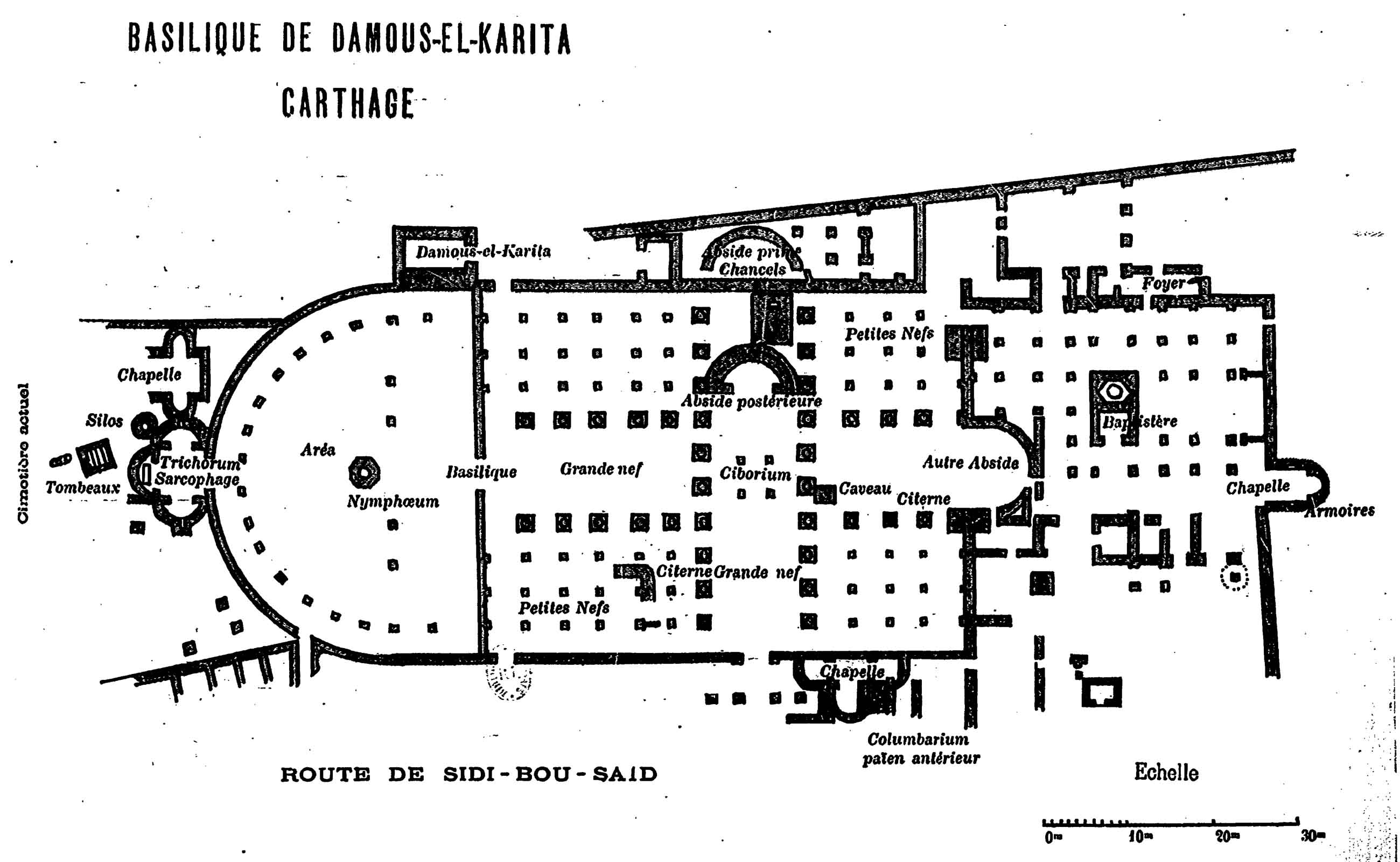
Plan of the basilica, Delattre, 1892

The most massive element of the complex is a church with nine (then eleven) naves, from which the largest measures 12.80 metres and eleven bays whose pillars have Corinthian capitals, the barrels of the columns are made out of green marble and the bases out of white marble. The main building is oriented South-West- North-East and measures 65 metres over 45.

=== Rotunda ===
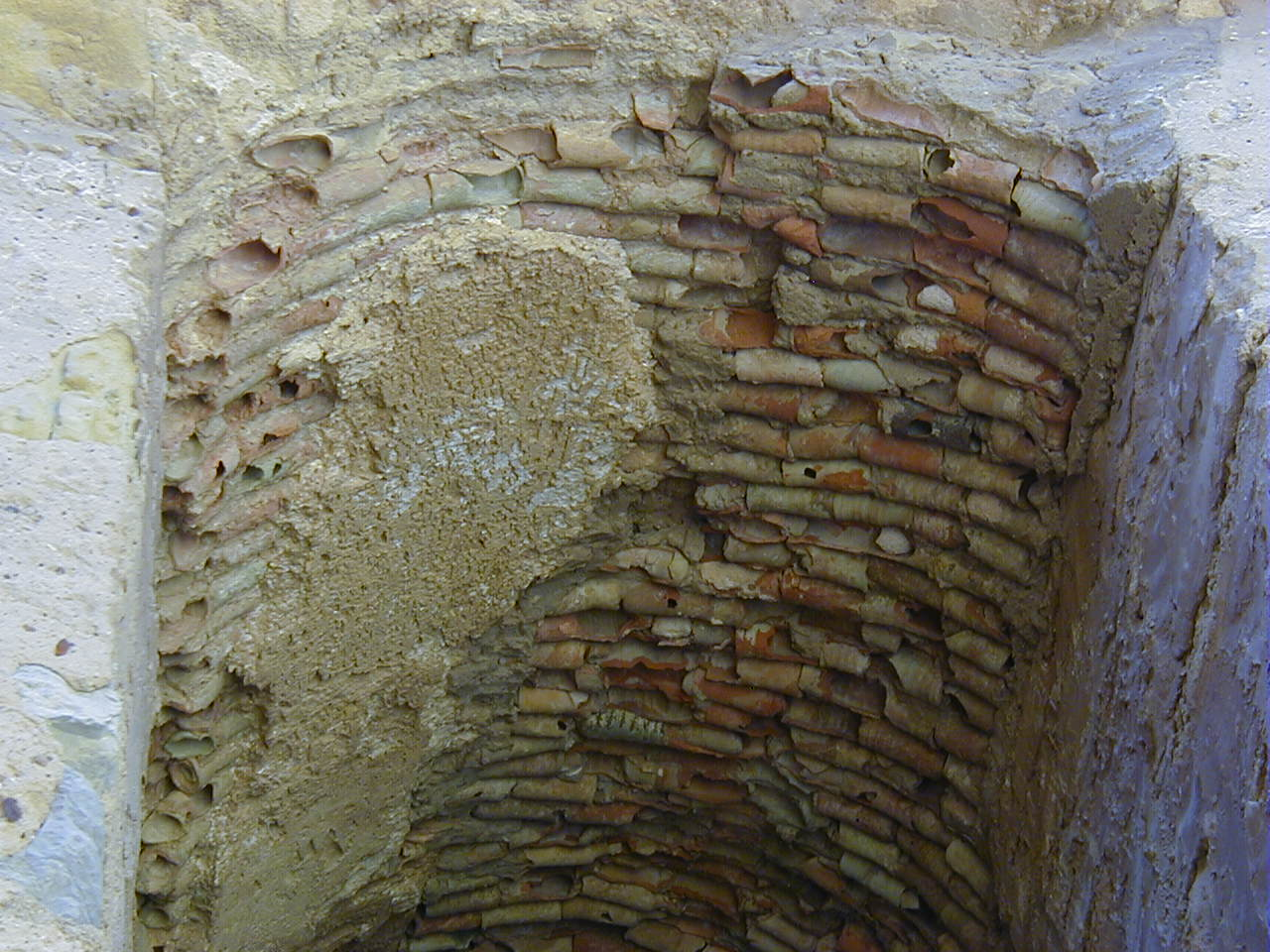
Terracotta pipes' ceiling in one of the access corridors to the underground rotunda

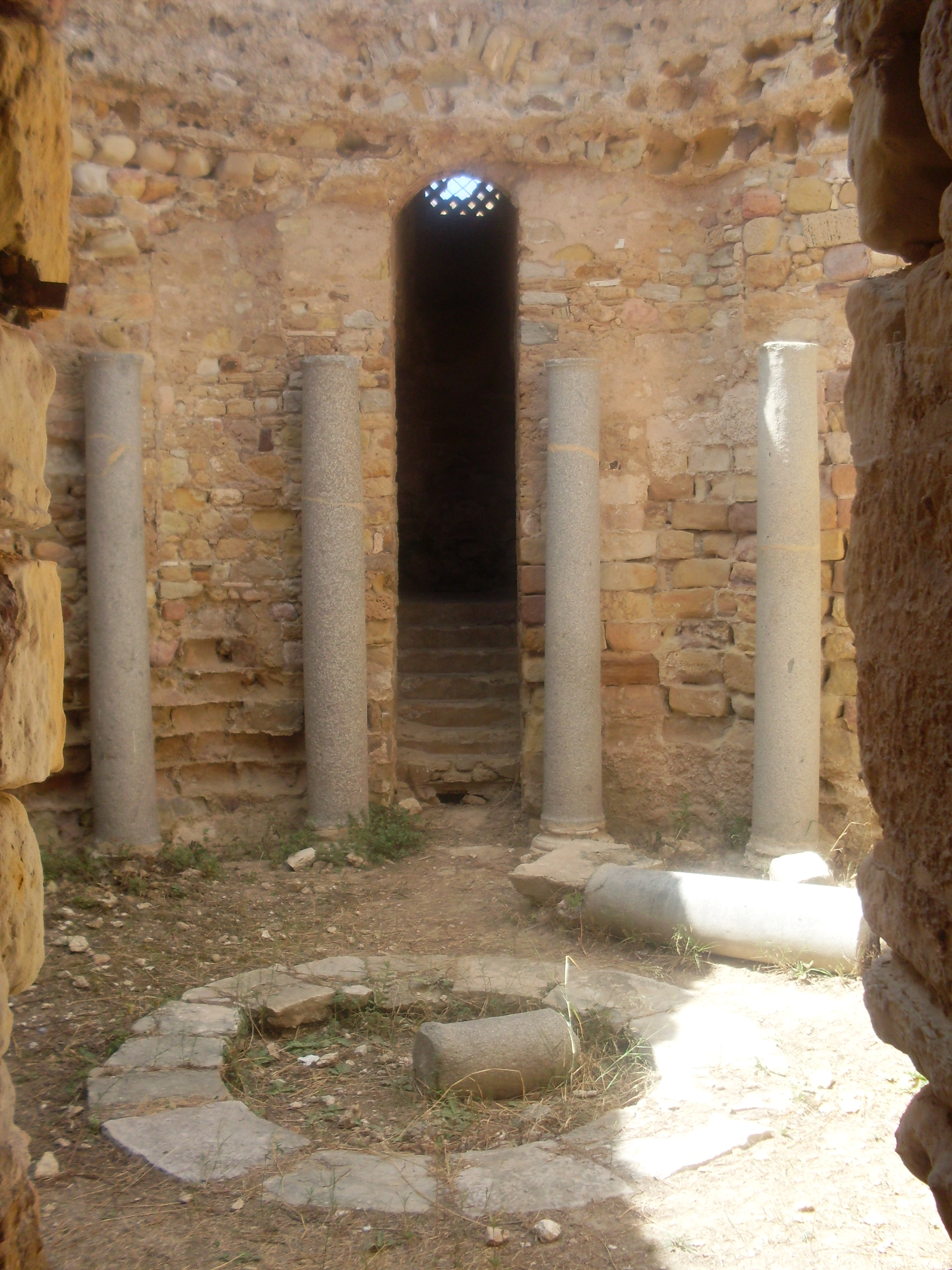
Rotunda situated near the basilica

The most important element of the known appendices is located in the southwest : It is a subterran rotunda, having an interior diameter of 9.15 metres with a cupola. Two symmetrical stairs, vaulted and in square permit the access; the ceiling is still partially covered with tubes of terracotta. The corridor is 10.40 metres long and forms an angle before giving access to the underground room. In the past, one corridor permitted entry while the other permitted exit according to Delattre and based on the interpretation of a mosaic found nearby.

== See also ==
- Basilica of Saint-Cyprien

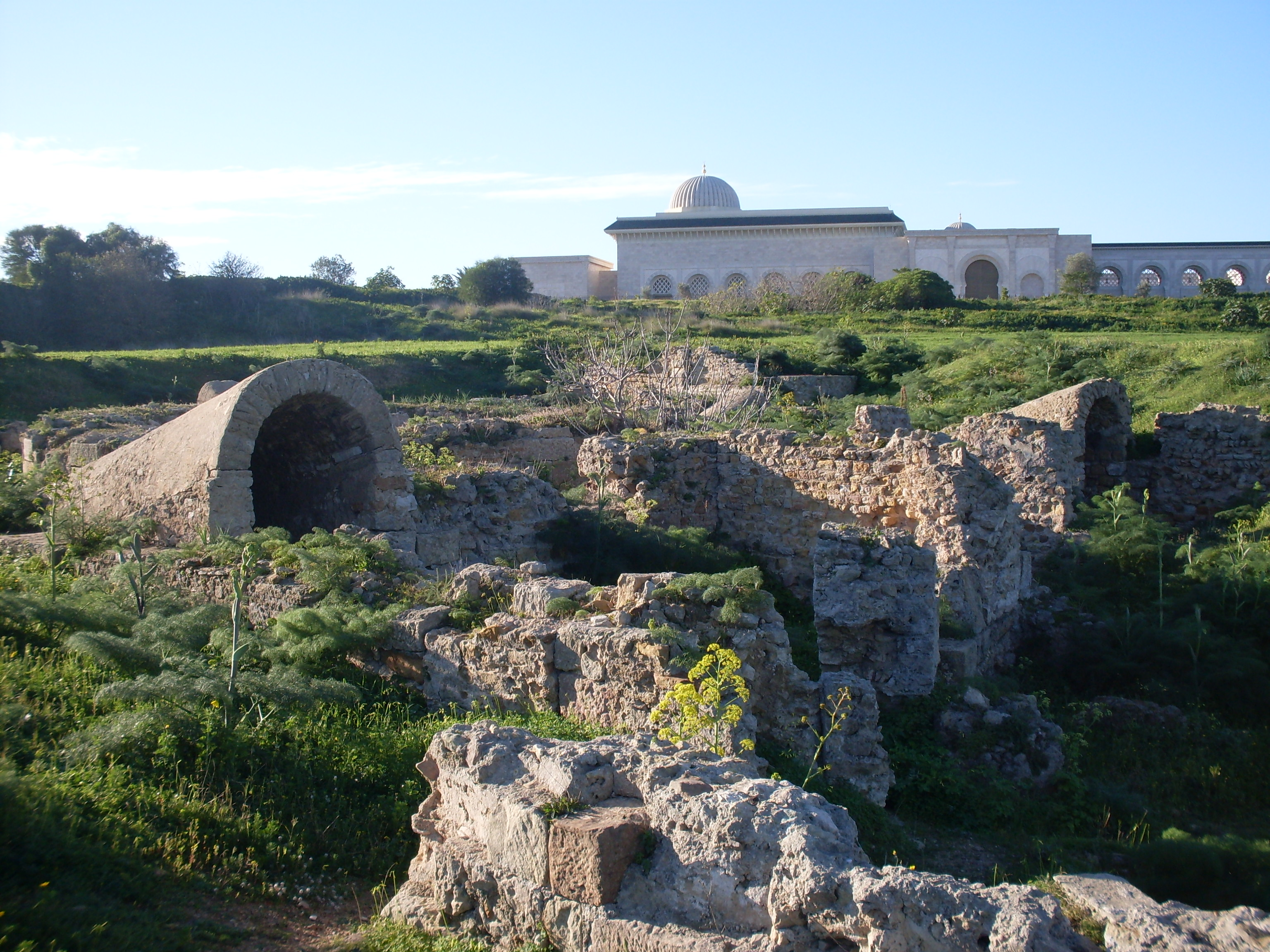
Upper level of the rotunda with access to the stairs
