= Albi Cathedral =

Cathedral of Saint Cecilia of Albi Cathédrale Sainte-Cécile d'Albi
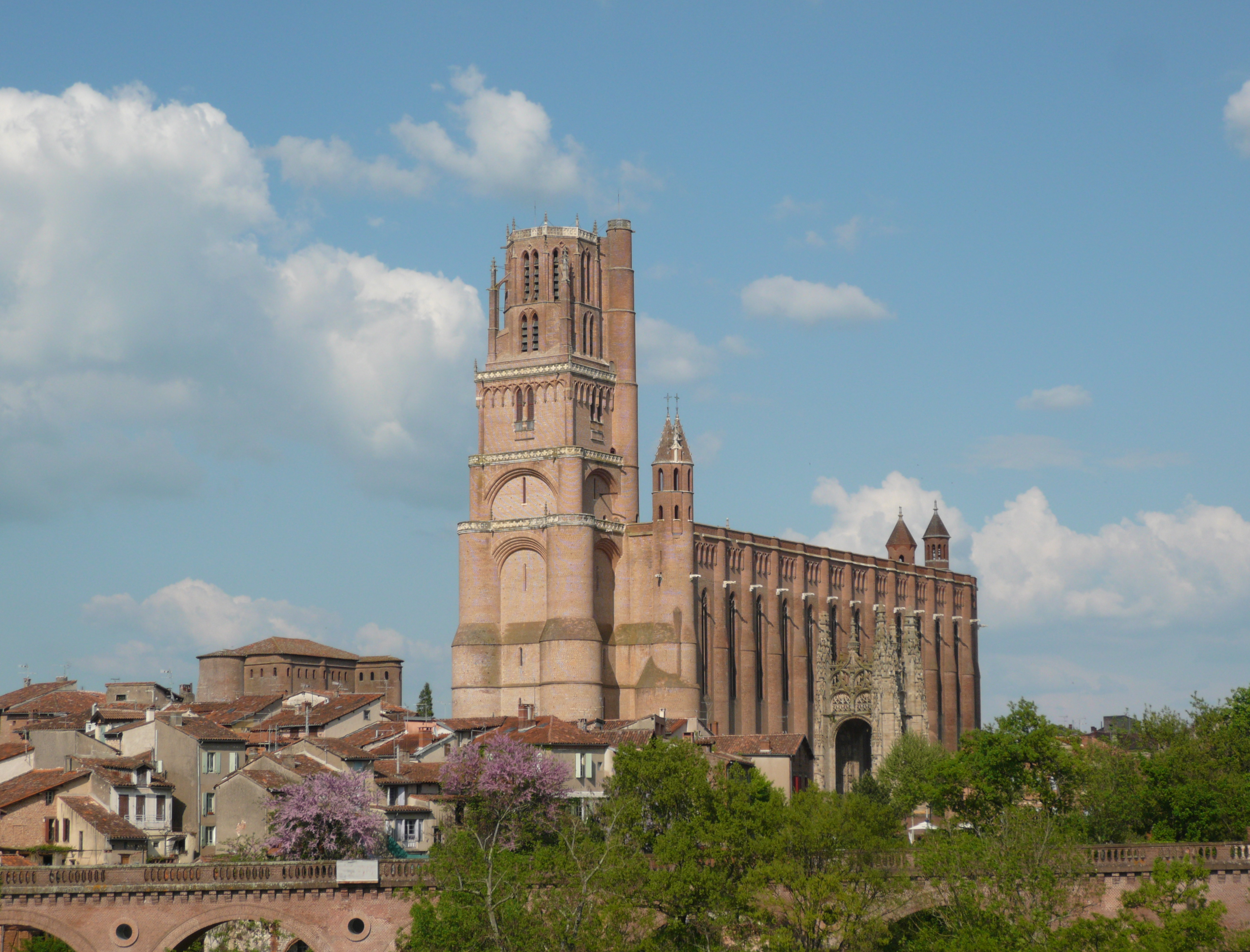
- View of Albi Cathedral
- Cathedral of Saint Cecilia of Albi; Cathédrale Sainte-Cécile d'Albi
- Location: Place Sainte-Cécile, Albi, France
- Denomination: Catholic Church
- Churchmanship: Latin

History
- Status: Cathedral

Architecture
- Functional status: Active
- Architectural type: church
- Style: Southern French Gothic
- Groundbreaking: 1282
- Completed: 1480

Specifications
- Length: 113.5 m (372 ft)
- Width: 35 m (115 ft)
- Height: 78 m (256 ft)
- Materials: red brick

Administration
- Province: Archdiocese of Albi within Ecclesiastical Province of Toulouse

Monument historique
- Official name: Cathédrale Sainte-Cécile d'Albi
- Type: Classé

UNESCO World Heritage Site
- Official name: Cathédrale Sainte-Cécile d'Albi
- Location: Europe
- Criteria: Cultural: (ii), (iv), (vi)
- Inscription: 2010 (34th Session)

The Cathedral of Saint Cecilia of Albi (French: Cathédrale Sainte-Cécile d'Albi), also known as Albi Cathedral, is the seat of the Catholic Archbishop of Albi. First built in the aftermath of the Albigensian Crusade, the exterior resembles a fortress, but the interior is lavishly decorated with art and sculpture, a very ornate choir screen, and walls in bright blues and golds, in the Toulousian or Southern French Gothic style. It was begun in 1282 and was under construction for 200 years. It is claimed to be the largest brick building in the world. In 2010 the cathedral, along with its episcopal buildings, was designated a UNESCO World Heritage Site because of its unique architecture and the remarkable consistency in its design.

== History ==
=== Early churches ===
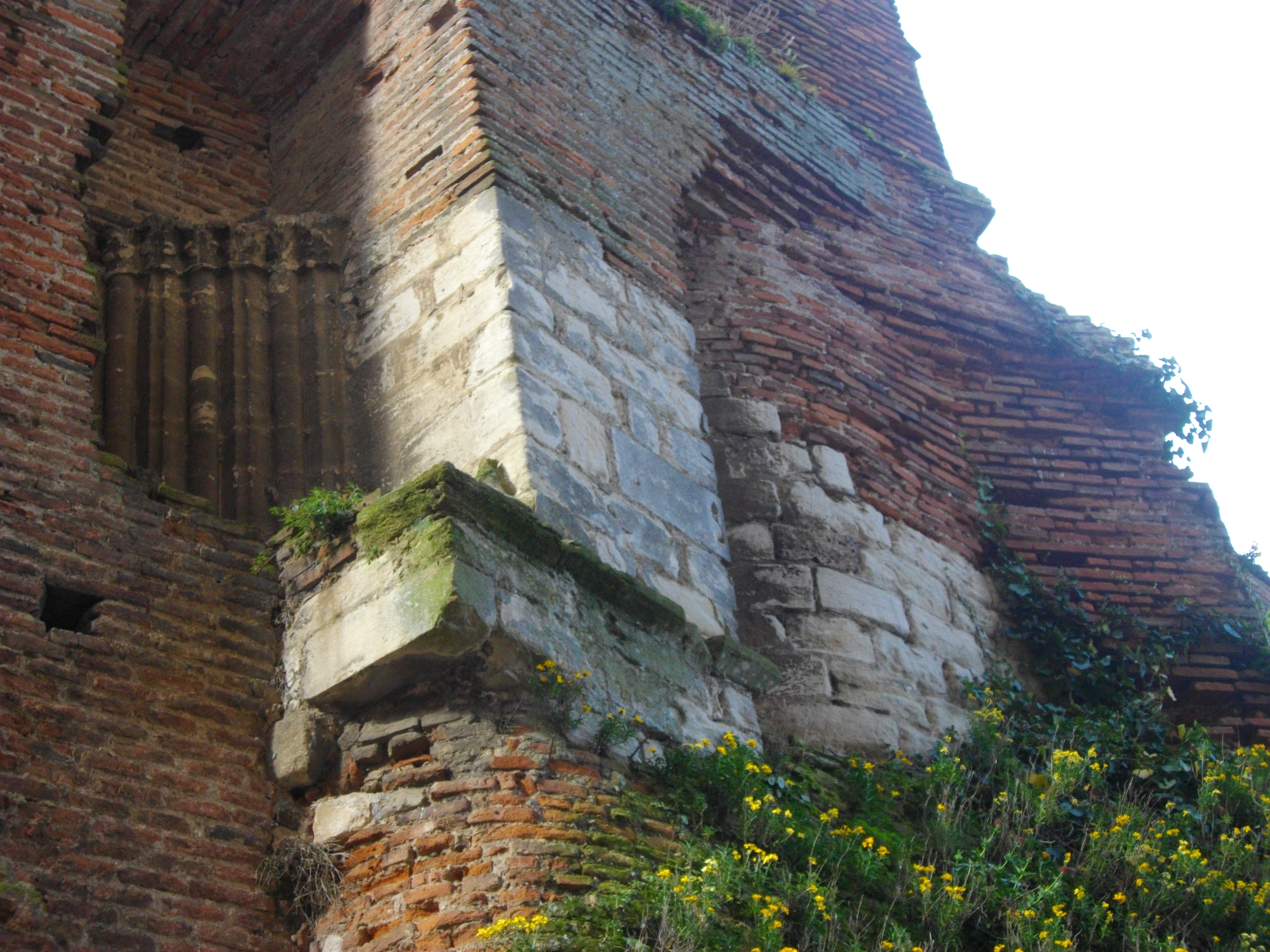
Vestige of a Romanesque portal

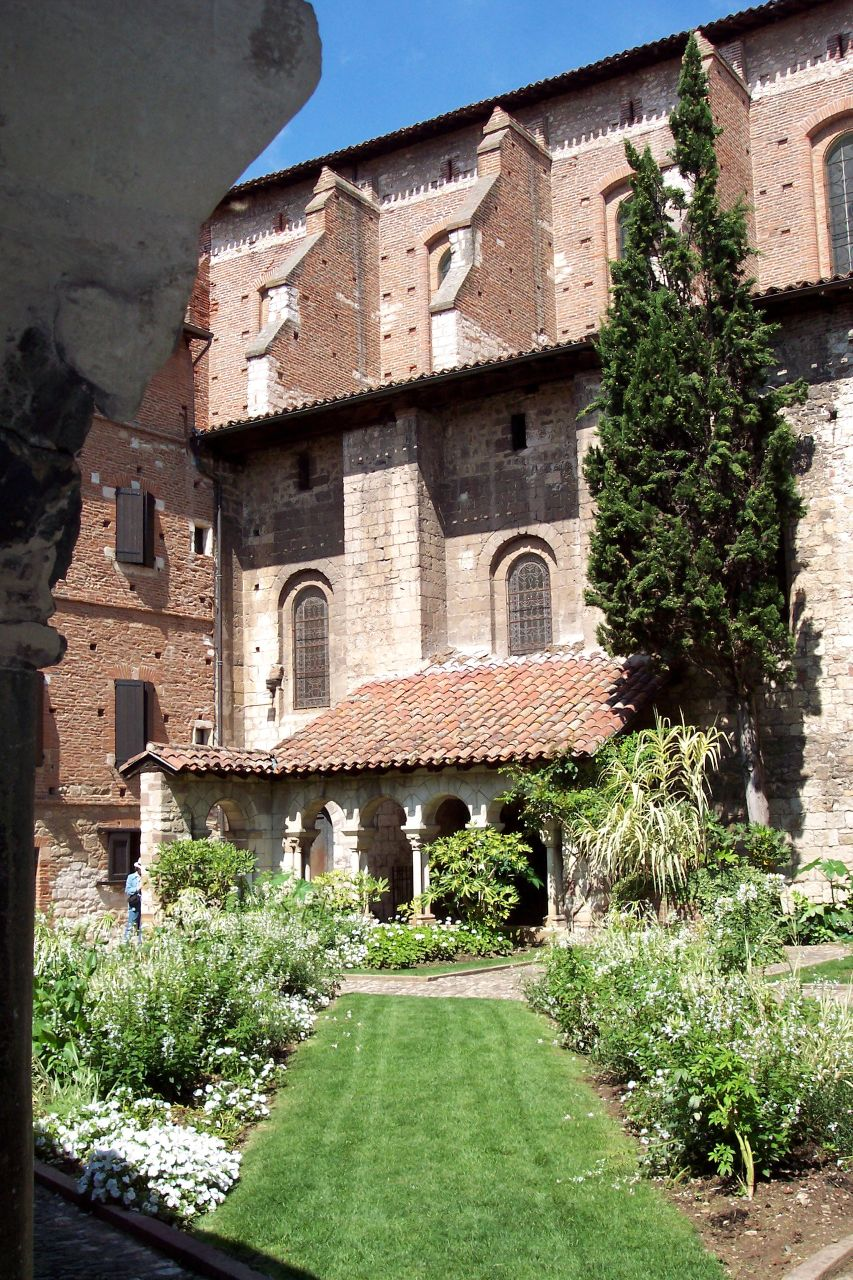
The Romanesque walls of the collegiate of Saint Salvy

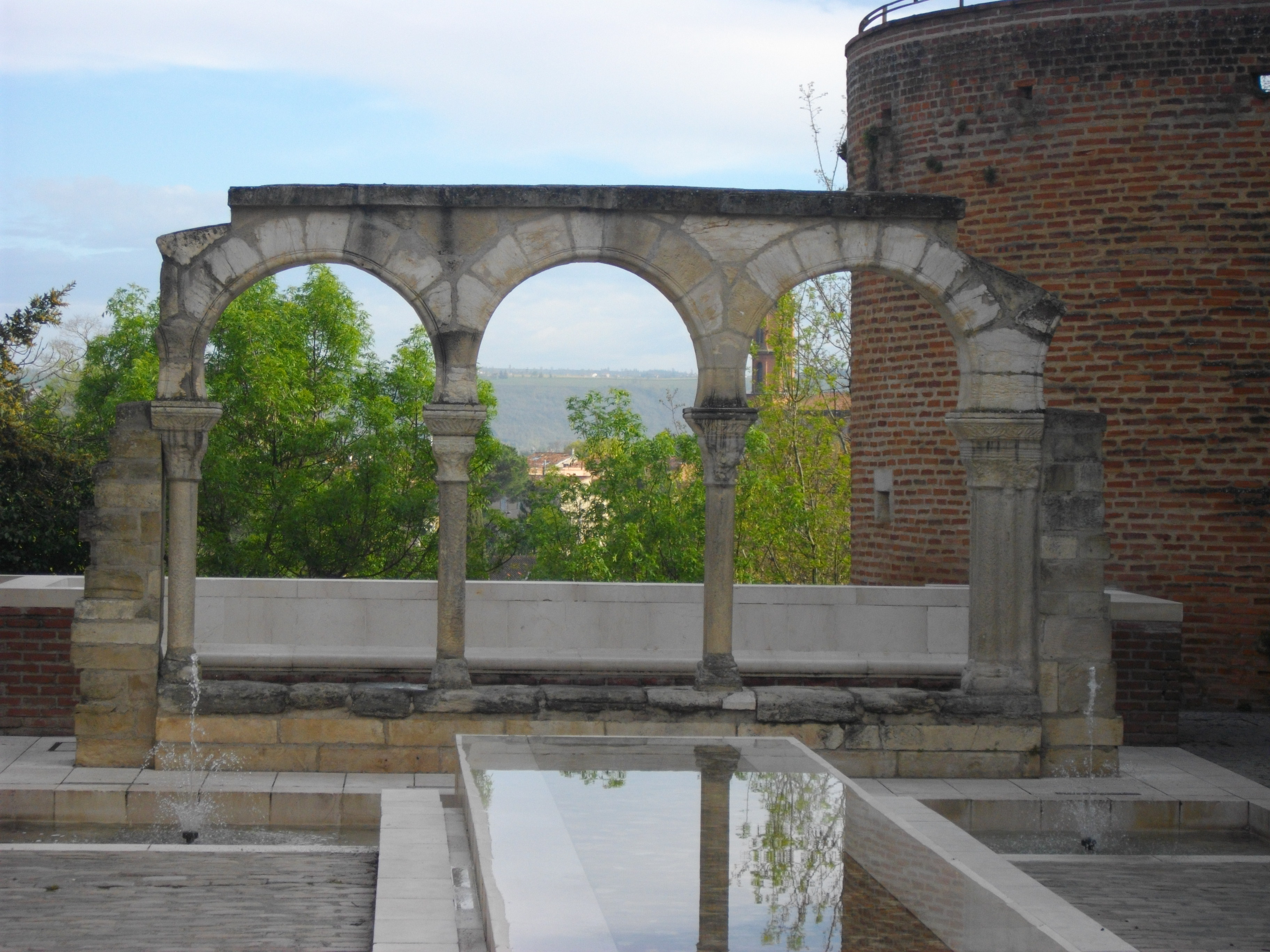
Remains of the cloister of the previous Romanesque cathedral

The first recorded church and bishop's residence was built at the end of the 4th century, and is believed to have burned in about 666. A second is mentioned in 920, named for Saint Cecilia, a wealthy Roman noblewoman and martyr, who was also a patroness of musicians. That church was part of a complex of episcopal buildings, including a baptistry and sanctuary dedicated to Saint Peter. A third church, in the Romanesque style, was built of stone at the end of the 12th century and was located between the present cathedral and bishop's palace. It incorporated some stonework of the earlier buildings, and included a cloister on the south side. Some of the arches of the cloister are found today in the municipal park of Rochegude in Albi.

In the 12th century, Albi was part of the Province of Languedoc, ruled by the Count of Toulouse, who was appointed by the King of France. The region became a battleground between the established church and the followers of a dissident religious movement called Catharism. The Cathars had a strong presence in Albi around 1165 AD. In 1208, Pope Innocent III launched the Albigensian Crusade, named for Albi, to destroy the Cathars in southern France. It ended in 1209 with the defeat and massacre of the Cathars at Carcassonne, and the end of the semi-independence of the states of Languedoc. In 1229 Albi came under the joint rule of the Lord of Castres and of King Louis VIII of France.

=== Gothic cathedral ===
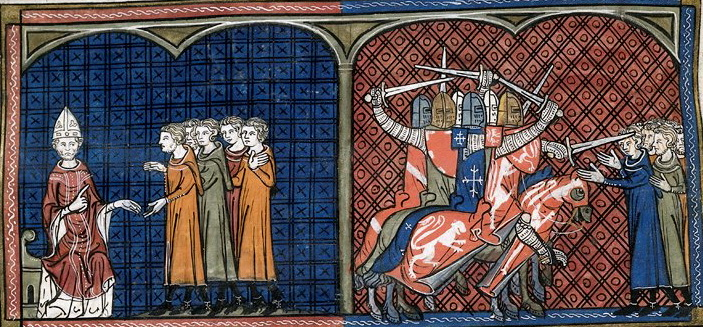
Pope Innocent III launches the Albigensian Crusade against the Cathars (From "Chronicles of Saint-Denis", 14th century)

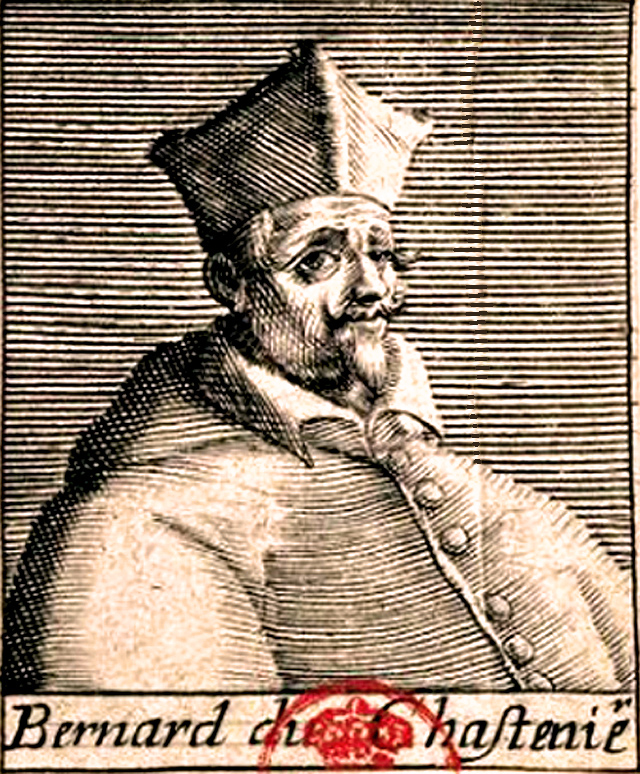
Bishop Bernard de Castagnet, the patron of the Gothic cathedral

Bernard de Castanet (1240–1317), who became Bishop of Albi in 1276, was the key figure behind the construction of the Gothic cathedral. He was a judge and lawyer, had been an officer of the Inquisition for Languedoc, and later became a cardinal. He raised funds for the new building by setting aside one-twentieth of the revenue of the chapter, and offering spiritual incentives to parishioners who donated a tenth of their income. He also made imaginative use of the relics of Saint Cecilia, possessed by the church, in his fundraising. He economised by using brick rather than stone to construct the new cathedral, which was easier work. While building the cathedral, he also began construction of a new bishop's palace and other supporting buildings.

One result of the battle against the Cathars was the fortress-like appearance of the Cathedral of Albi. It was intended to illustrate the power of the bishop, his unity with the king, and his fierce resistance against heresy and religious enemies.

The cathedral was constructed beginning with an apse at the east end and building west through the choir, between 1282 and 1300. Bernard de Castanet died in 1317. The nave walls were built, topped by channels to carry off rain water, between about 1310 and 1340, followed by then the base of the bell tower built between 1355 and 1366, and the construction of the vaults over the nave. Work on the nave was completed at about 1330.

A new bishop, Dominique de Florence (in office 1397–1410), completed the monumental portal on the west side. There was a long lull before construction resumed again under another bishop, Louis d'Amboise (1474–1505), a counsellor of Louis XI of France and Charles VIII of France. The cathedral was finally consecrated on 23 April 1480. A cross placed on the west wall on that date commemorates that event.

=== 15th to 18th century – Gothic to Renaissance ===
The 15th century rood screen

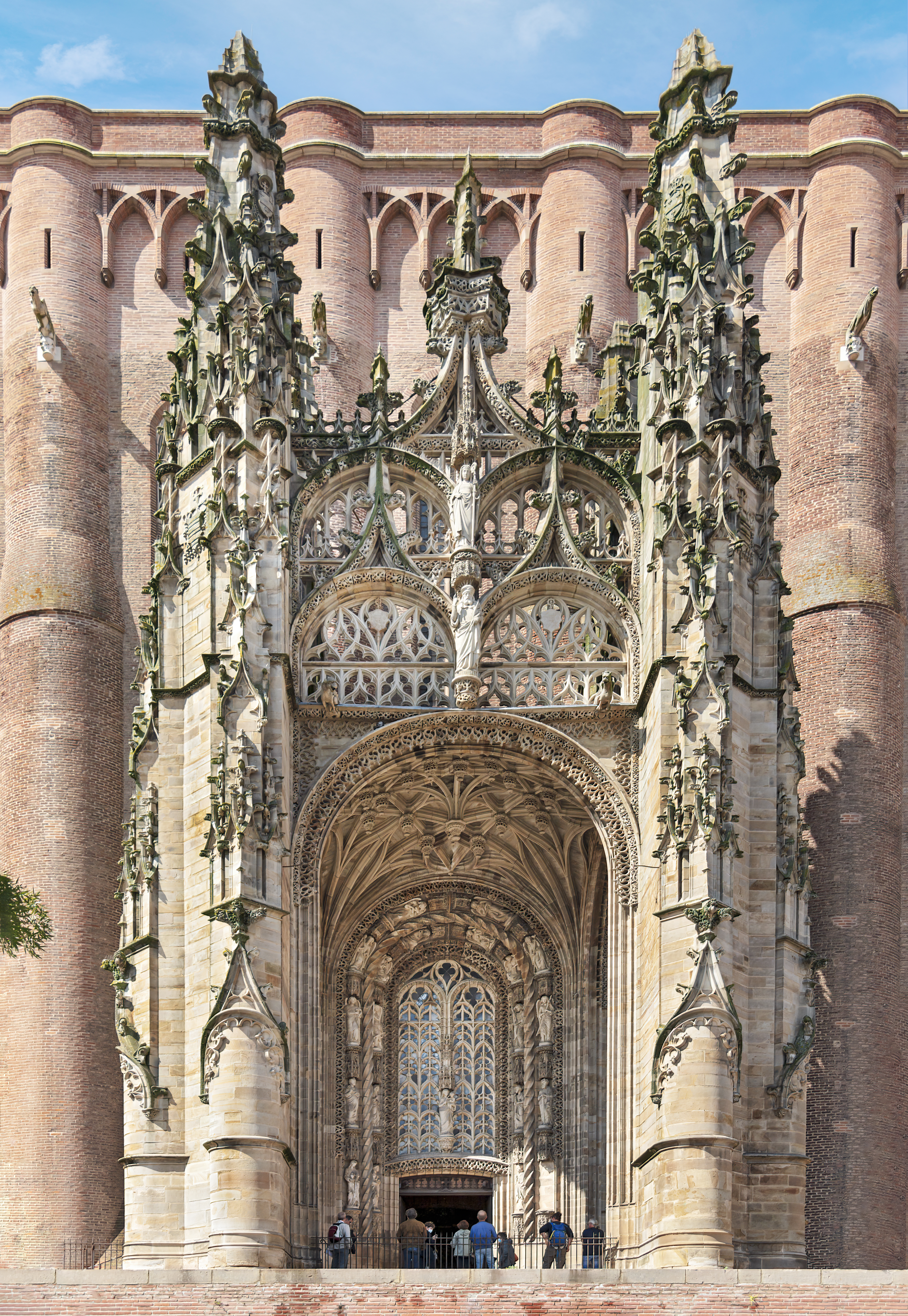
The late Gothic portal (early 15th c.)

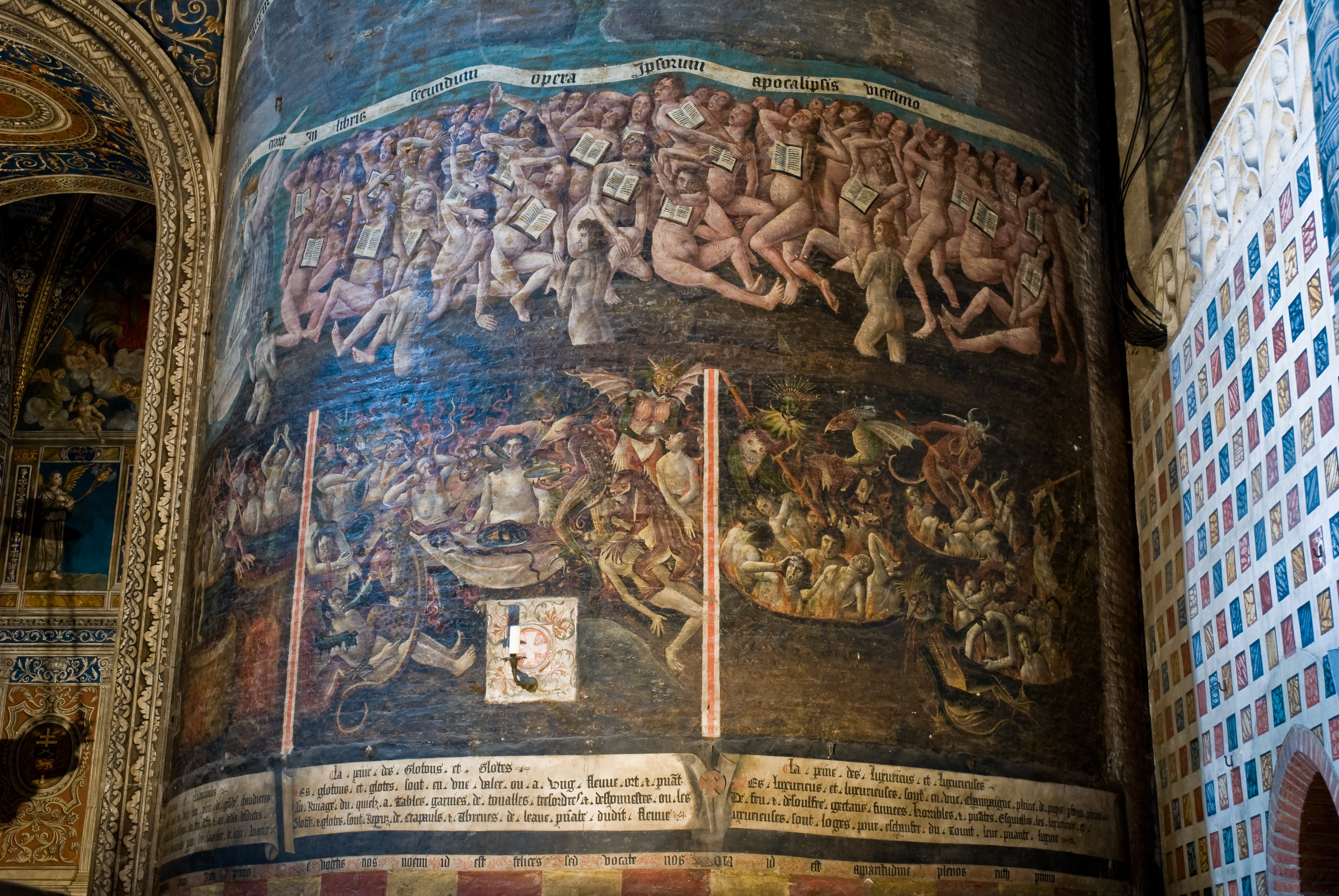
The "Last Judgement" mural (detail, end of 15th c.)

The most important new decorative project was the rood screen or choir screen (jubé in French), a highly ornamental fence which surrounded the entire choir, the area reserved for the clergy, separating it from the nave and aisles. It was made between 1474 and 1483, covered five traverses of the cathedral, and assured privacy for their services while other activities were going on within the cathedral. It was enclosed in a grill decorated with flamboyant double-curved flame motifs, and was richly decorated with sculpture depicting the life of Saint Cecile.

Construction and decoration continued through the rest of the 15th century, with the completion of the tower, 78 meters high, in 1492, and the addition of tribunes which divided the elevation of the chapels between the buttresses. The most important art added in the late 15th century was the enormous mural of the Last Judgement, on the interior of the west facade, fully fifteen meters high and eighteen meters wide. A very ornate baldaquin in the flamboyant style was added to the southern entrance in the beginning of the 16th century.

In the 16th century, a major campaign of construction and redecoration commenced under Bishop Charles Le Goux de la Berchère, who wished to remake the interior in the more classical style, more open to the faithful. This involved constructing a new chapel between the base of the tower to the nave, and a new altar visible from the chapel. The new chapel also received the relics of Saint Clair of Albi, considered the first bishop. The construction of the new chapel required the destruction of a central portion of the mural of the Last Judgement, including the figure of Christ.

In the first half of the 18th century the new bishop, Armand Pierre de la Croix de Castries, installed a new organ and continued to replace Gothic decoration with the classical style. He concealed the flamboyant decoration of the new portal under a lath of plaster, and brought in Italian sculptors Bernard Virgile and Jacques Antoine Mazetti, pupils of the Renaissance sculptor Maderni, to redecorate the axis chapel at the east end, and to create a new Renaissance bishop's seat made of marble and stucco, which was placed on the southern side of the nave.

The French Revolution in 1789 brought devastation to the cathedral. The celebrated reliquary of the True Cross and other treasures were seized, stripped of jewels and melted down for their gold in 1792. The most precious element of decoration, the rood screen, was also threatened.

The constitutional bishop himself, Monseigneur Gausserrand, proposed the destruction of the rood screen, not for political reasons but because he needed space to hold Sunday services for the congregation of the Parish; the nave itself was occupied at this time by the Society of the Friends of the Constitution. At the request of the Bishop, a decree was issued in 1792 for the destruction of the rood screen. Fortunately, an engineer of the Ministry of Bridges and Highways, François Mariès, learned of the plan and wrote to the Minister of the Interior and Religious Cults; "...If we take upon ourselves the right to destroy that which we owe to the genius, the generosity and the piety of our ancestors, what right do we have to expect the preservation of those which the memorable events of our own time will inspire?" In response, the minister set aside the proposed destruction of the rood screen.

Two years later, the rood screen was threatened again. The cathedral was officially declared a revolutionary Temple of Reason, and became the property of the local revolutionary council, which declared that the rood screen was "a symbol of fanaticism and superstition". They destroyed the statues placed on the exterior of the rood screen, sparing only the statues of Adam and Eve, but fortunately did not destroy the interior of the screen. In the early 19th century the statues destroyed were replaced with figures of Christ, The Virgin Mary and Saint John from another church of the same period.

=== 19th to the 21st century ===
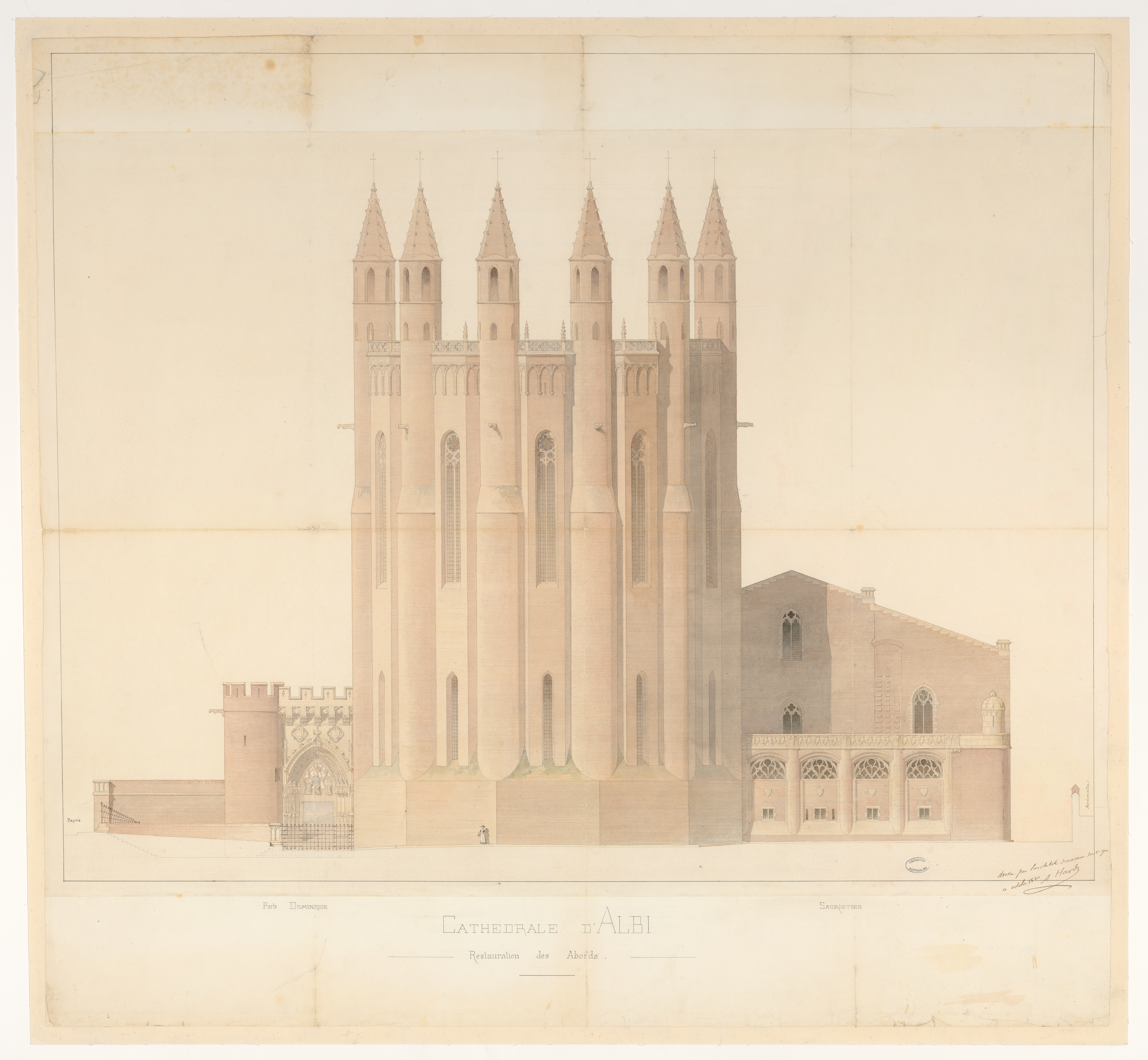
Plan for cathedral in 1880, with Neo-Gothic turrets

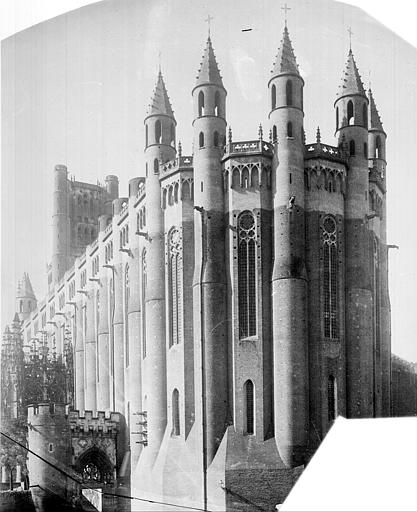
Cathedral in the 1880s

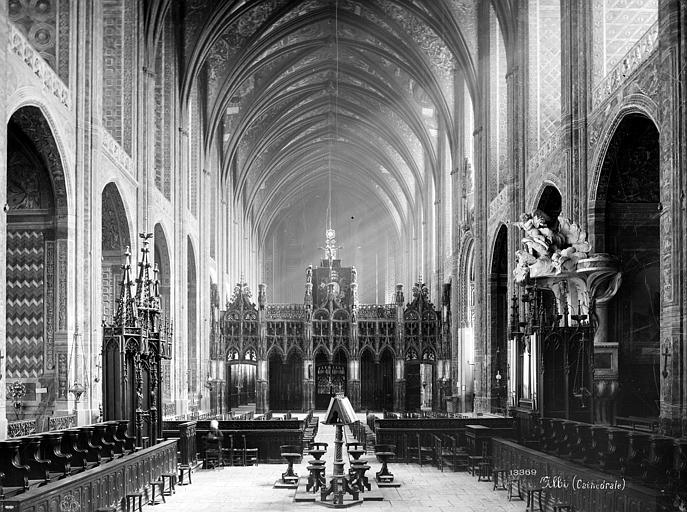
Interior in 1885

The first major restoration of the cathedral took place in the second half of the 19th century, between 1849 and 1876.Eugène Viollet-le-Duc reported that "the exterior of Saint-Cecile was never finished- the buttresses were never crowned, and nor were the walls themselves completed." The restoration project was led by the architect of the diocese, César Daly. He added a balustrade around the top of the walls, raised and strengthened the roof, and began to put into place ring of thirty small towers, each with a tower and 6.10 meters tall, atop each buttress. He also refashioned the vault of the baldaquin at the entrance with intertwining flamboyant ribs.

The addition of the multiple small towers and balustrade, which did not exist in Gothic times, did not please the residents of Albi. They protested and demanded a return to the original roofline. In 1876 Daly resigned. Many new projects were proposed and rejected before a new architect, Alphonse Potdevin, was selected in 1900. He removed the balustrade, reduced the new small towers to the height of the roof, and returned the cathedral to approximately its earlier appearance. The baldaquin at the entrance was reconstructed, and the interior, paintings and decoration underwent important conservation programs, which continue.

== Exterior ==
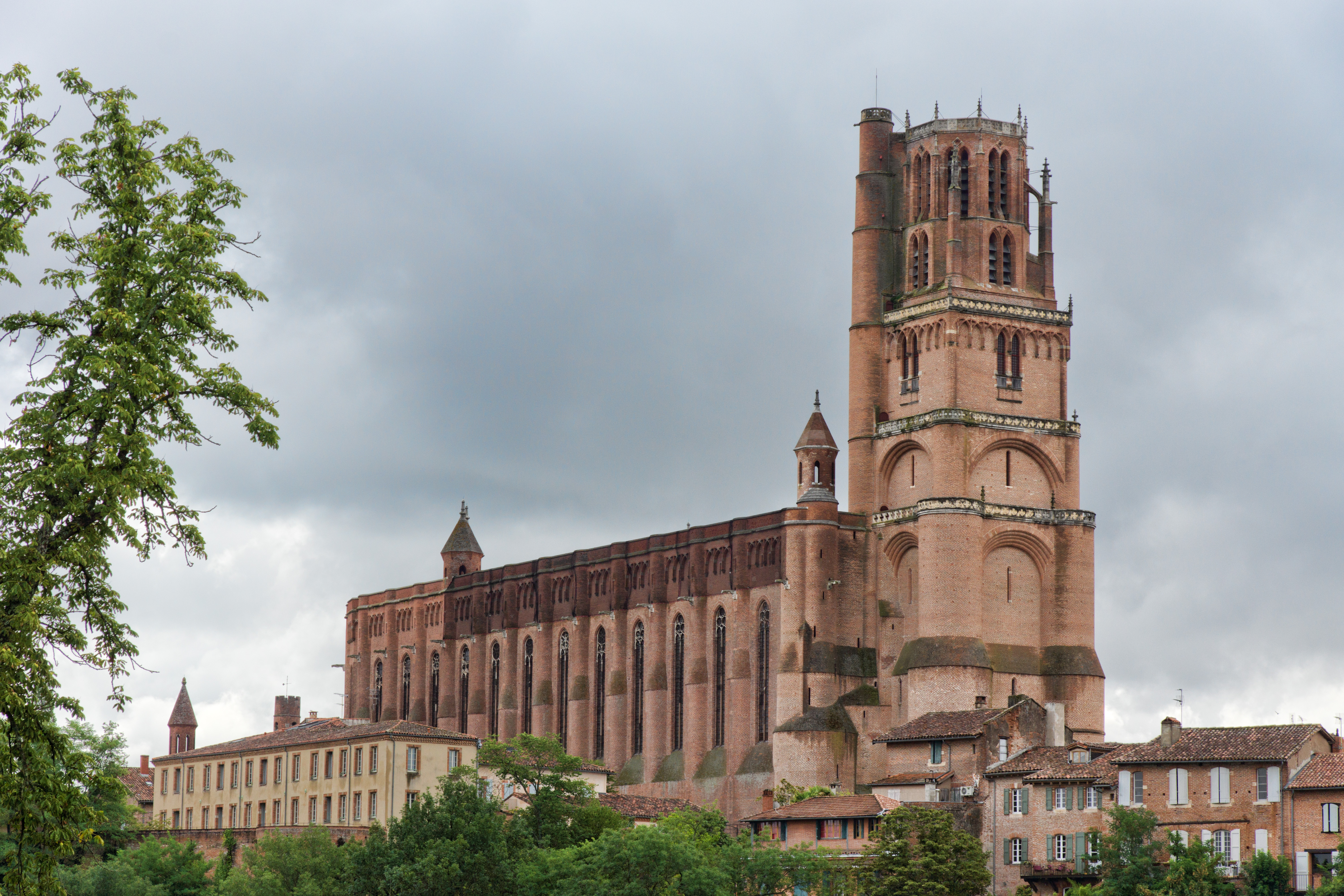
Exterior from the north.

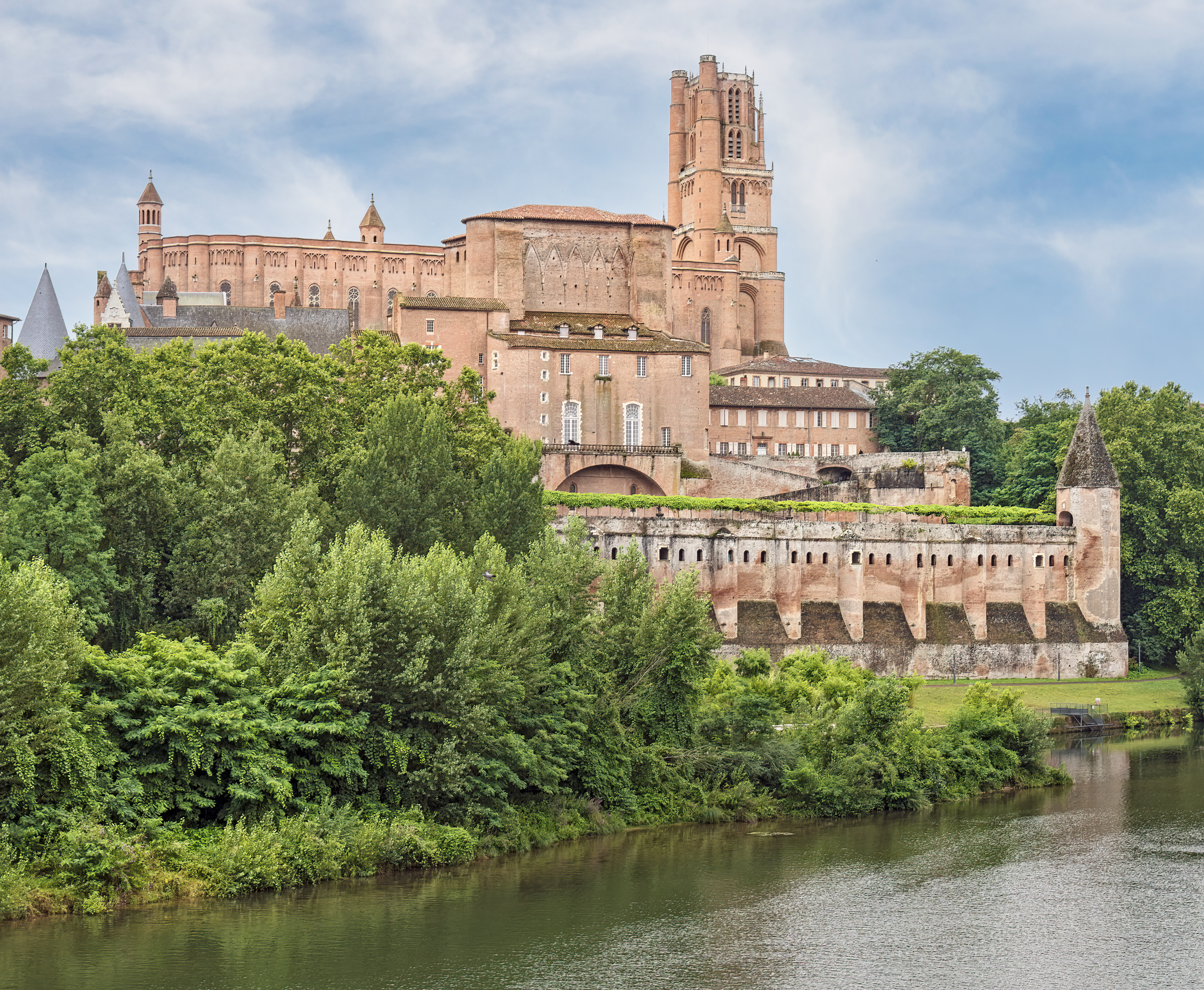
The cathedral and bishop's palace, viewed across the river Tarn.

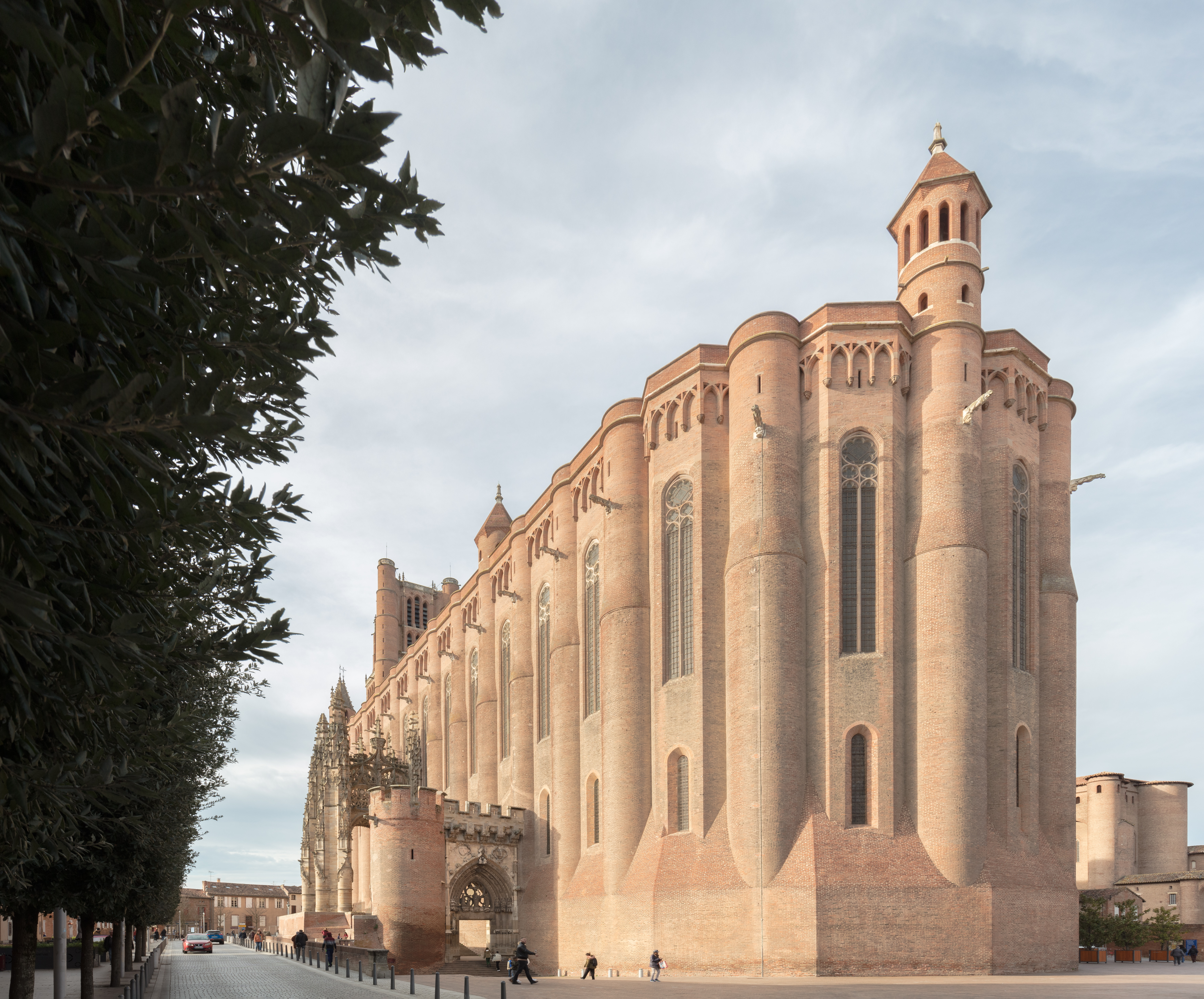
The chevet, from the east.

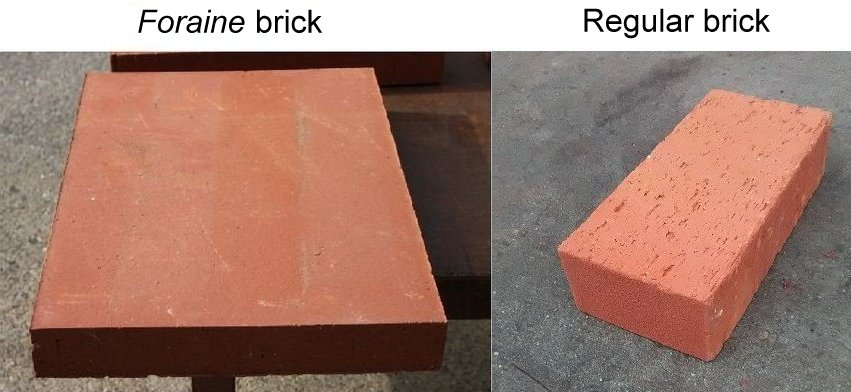
Like the rest of the city, the cathedral was built with Foraine bricks.

The cathedral is built in the Southern French Gothic style, also sometimes called the Toulouse style; the Convent of the Jacobins in Toulouse (1260–1292) follows a similar plan. As suitable building stone was scarce locally, it was built almost entirely of brick, which also was easier to work and gave the builders greater flexibility. It has a single vessel, without a transept, and without lower collateral aisles. This gives it the widest Gothic nave in France, 18 metres (59 ft), compared with 14.65 metres (48.1 ft) at Reims Cathedral and 14 metres (46 ft) at Notre-Dame de Paris.

Instead of using flying buttresses to support the upper walls, as in northern France, the thick walls of Toulouse are supported by semicircular buttresses integrated into the walls, rising up to the roof and coming inside to form the separations between the chapels. The principal entry is on the south side through an elaborate porch entered by a fortified stairway, rather than through the west front, as is traditional in French Gothic architecture.

=== Bell tower ===
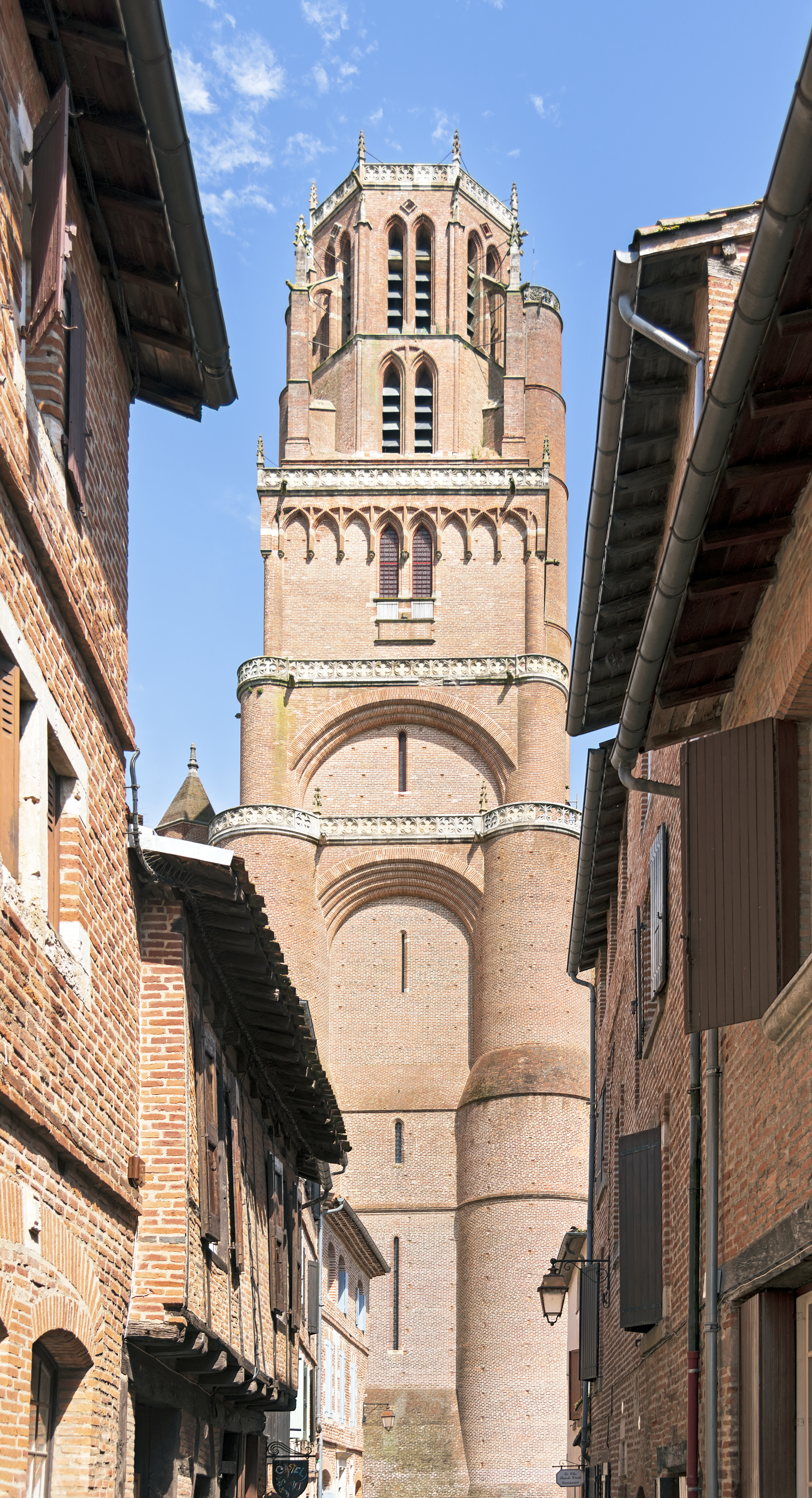
Bell tower

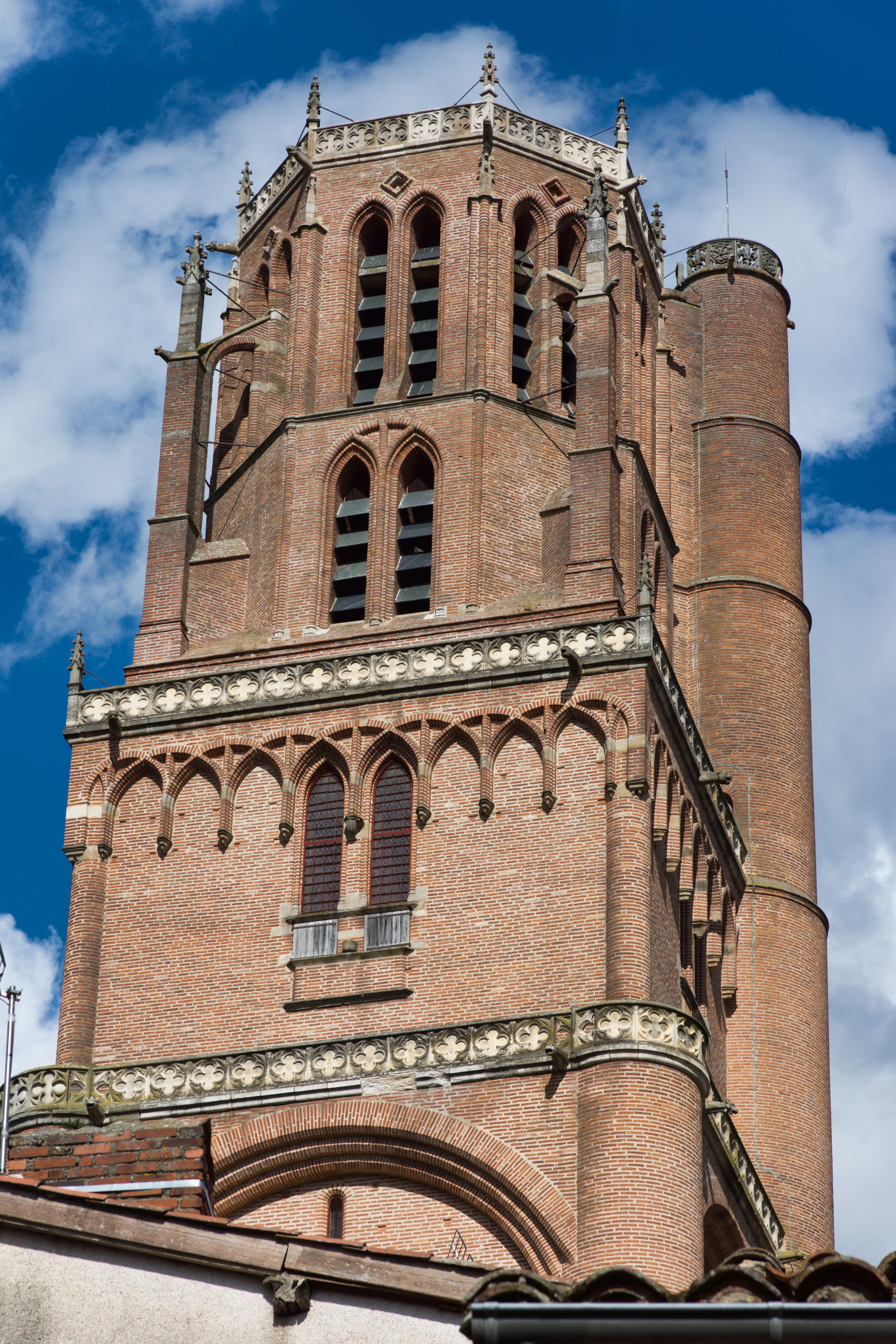
Top of the bell tower

The bell tower is 78 metres (256 ft) tall, and is composed of two distinct sections and styles. The lower portion was built between 1355 and 1366. It is composed of stacked square sections of which the exterior surfaces feature rounded arches and bands of decoration connecting cylindrical corners. The upper level, completed in 1492, has three octagonal sections, growing smaller as they rise in height, surrounded by balustrades. The top section has two delicate flying arches on the west side and two slender supporting towers on the east side.

=== Portals ===
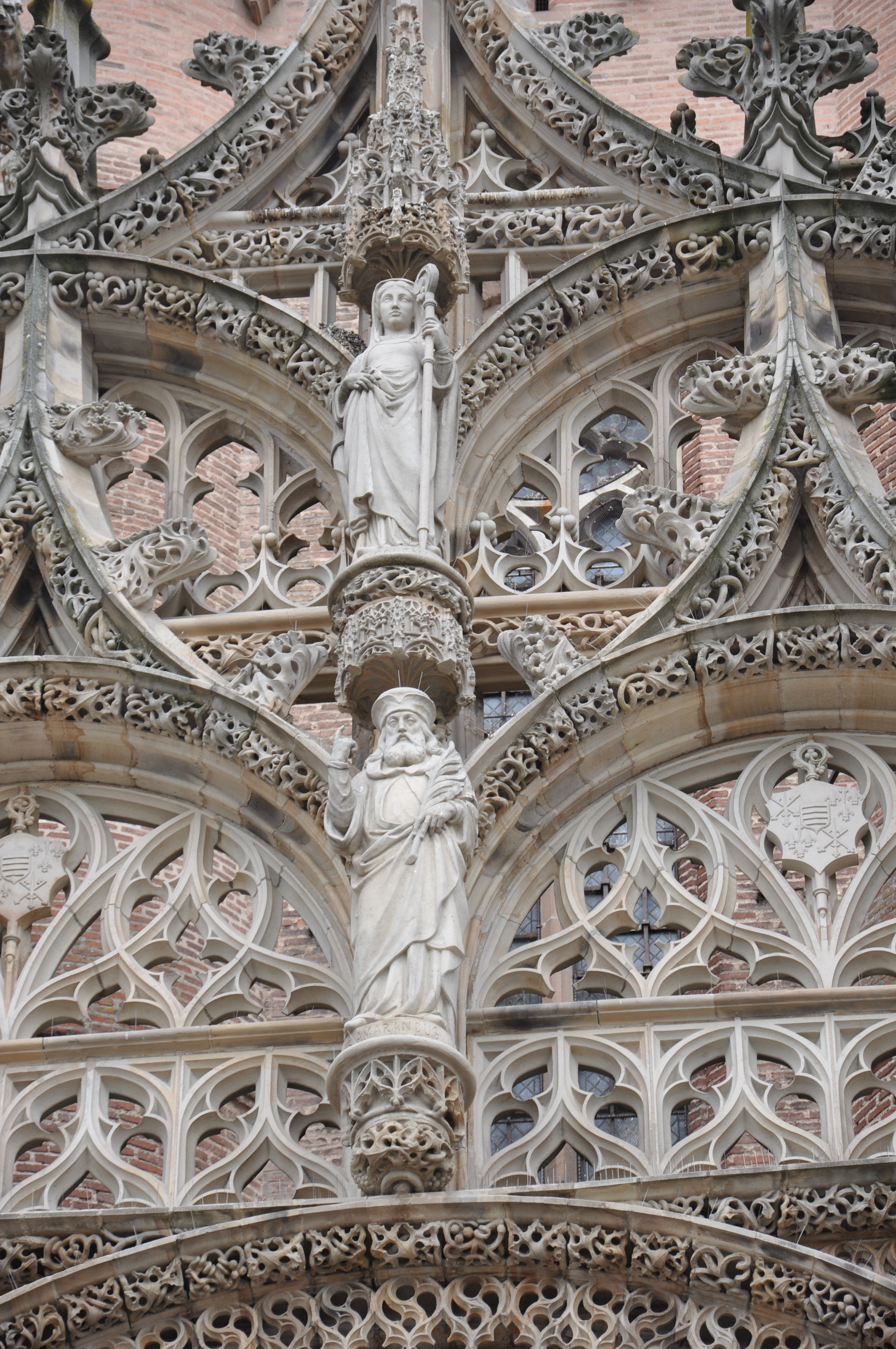
Detail of the South Portal

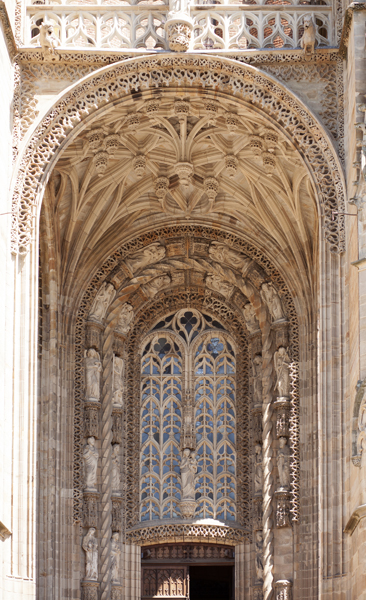
Door of the South Portal

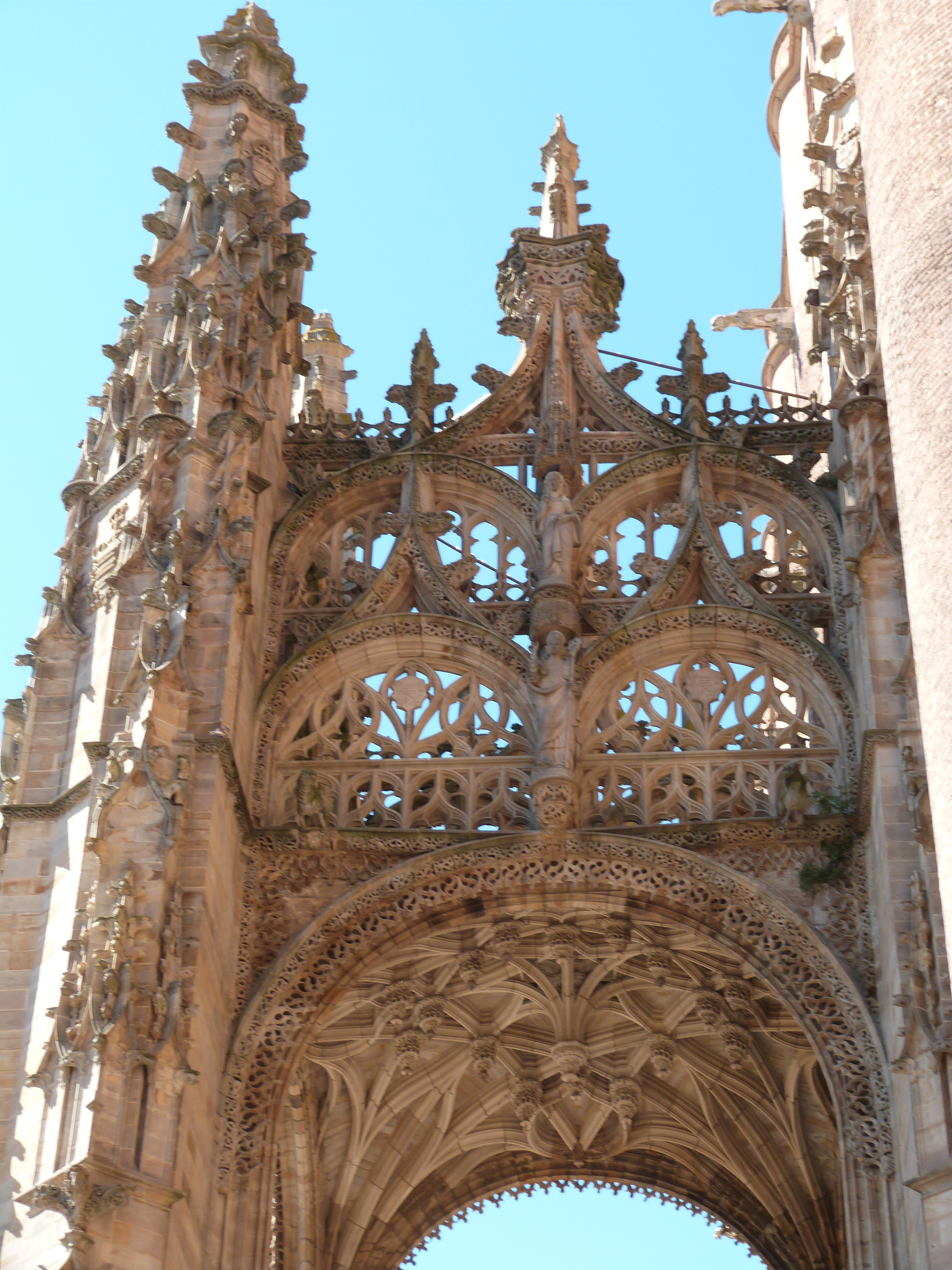
Baldaquin of the South Portal

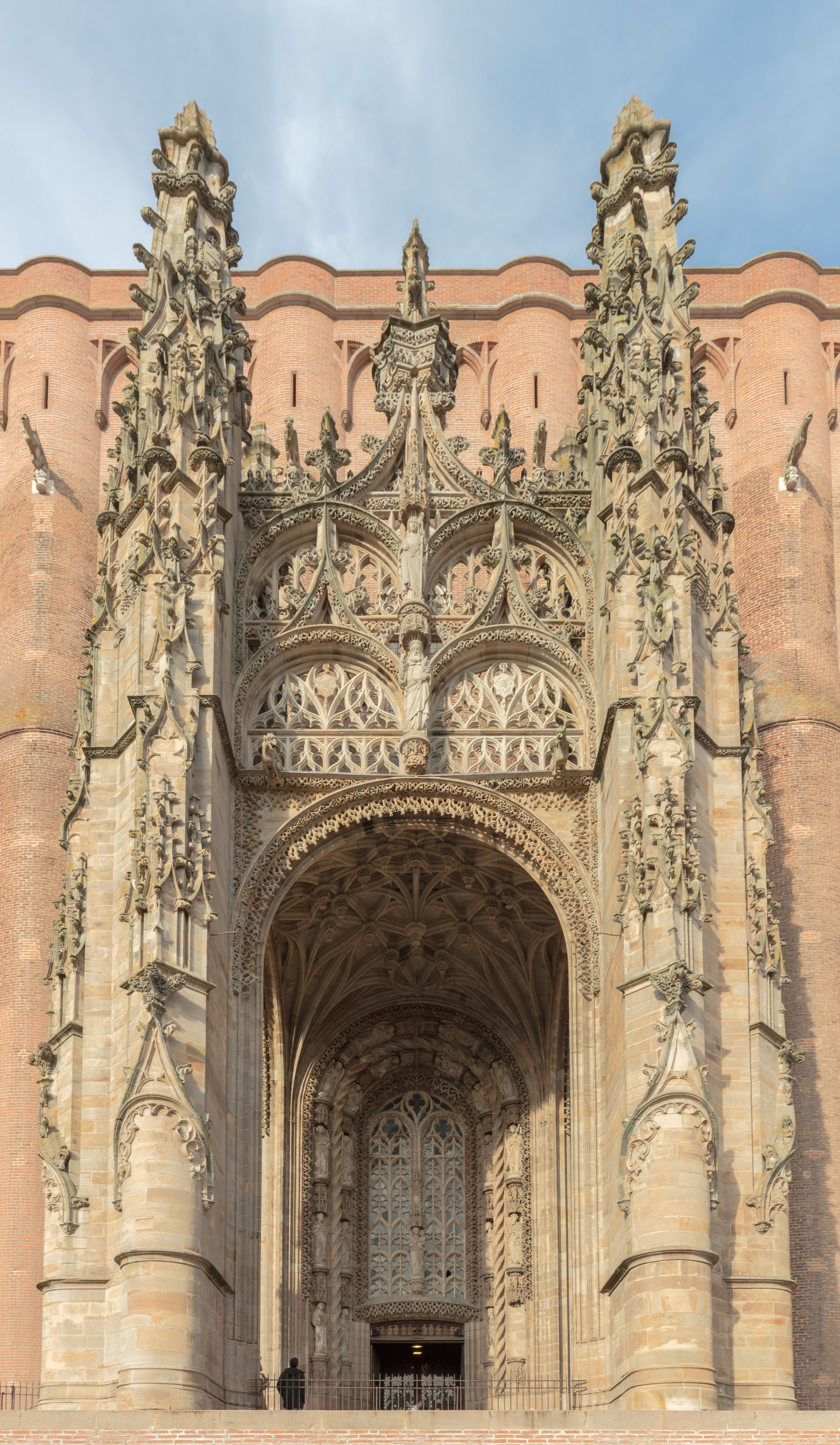
Baldaquin of the South Portal

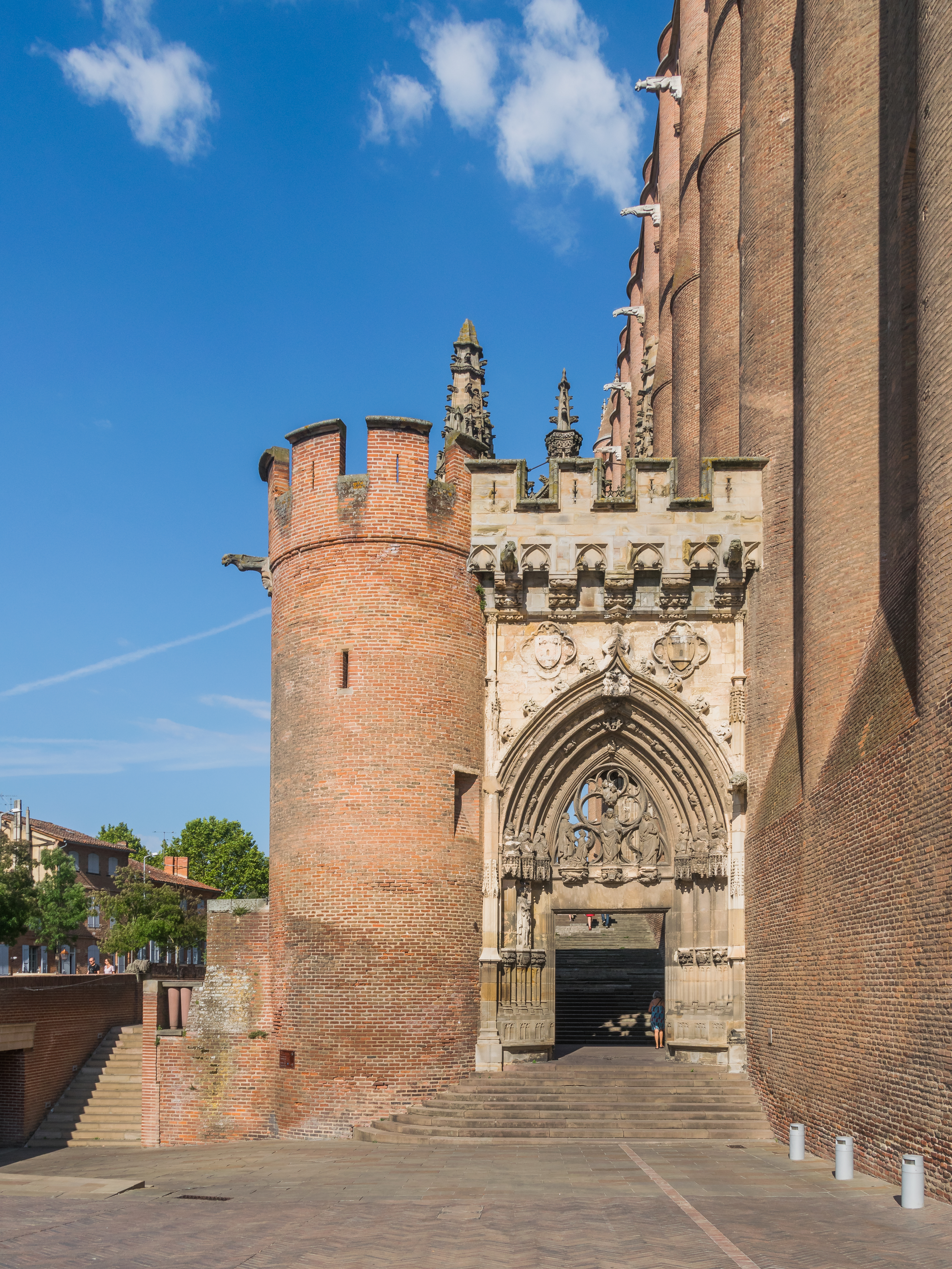
Portal of Dominique de Florence, or Saint-Cecilia

Unlike most Gothic cathedrals, where the principal entrance is on the west front, at Albi the main entrances are on the south and southeast sides and date later than much of the cathedral. The South Portal previously passed through a separate chapel, built in 1521 next to the cathedral, which was destroyed in the 19th century. It now is preceded by a very ornate baldaquin, whose vault is covered with intricate interlocking ribs of the flamboyant style. Between the baldaquin and the interior is an extraordinary forest of lacelike, twisting spires, crochets, and other ornament. The pioneer architectural preservationist Prosper Mérimée described the intent of the decoration as "admirable", but remarked that the finished baldaquin was "entirely absurd", since it was open to the sky, and offered no protection at all from the wind, rain or sun. It uniquely incorporates a statue of St Sigolena the Deaconess, who is the patroness saint of the city.

Because the cathedral is built on the side of a hill sloping down to the river, the entrance on the southeast side of the chevet is located 30 feet (9.1 meters) below the level of the nave and choir, and those entering must go up an outside stairway. The Portal of Dominique de Florence, named for the bishop who commissioned it, and also known as the Portal of Saint Cecilia, was built at the beginning of the 15th century between the chevet and one of the towers of the city wall. It gives access to the stairway which leads upward to the entrance into the apse of church. The portal has a lacelike open tympanum containing statuary and is crowned by quadrilobe bearing the coat of arms of the bishop who commissioned it.

== Interior ==
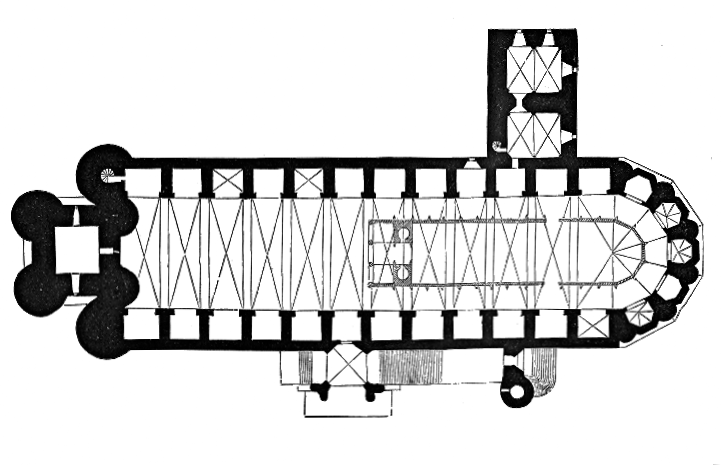
Plan of Albi Cathedral

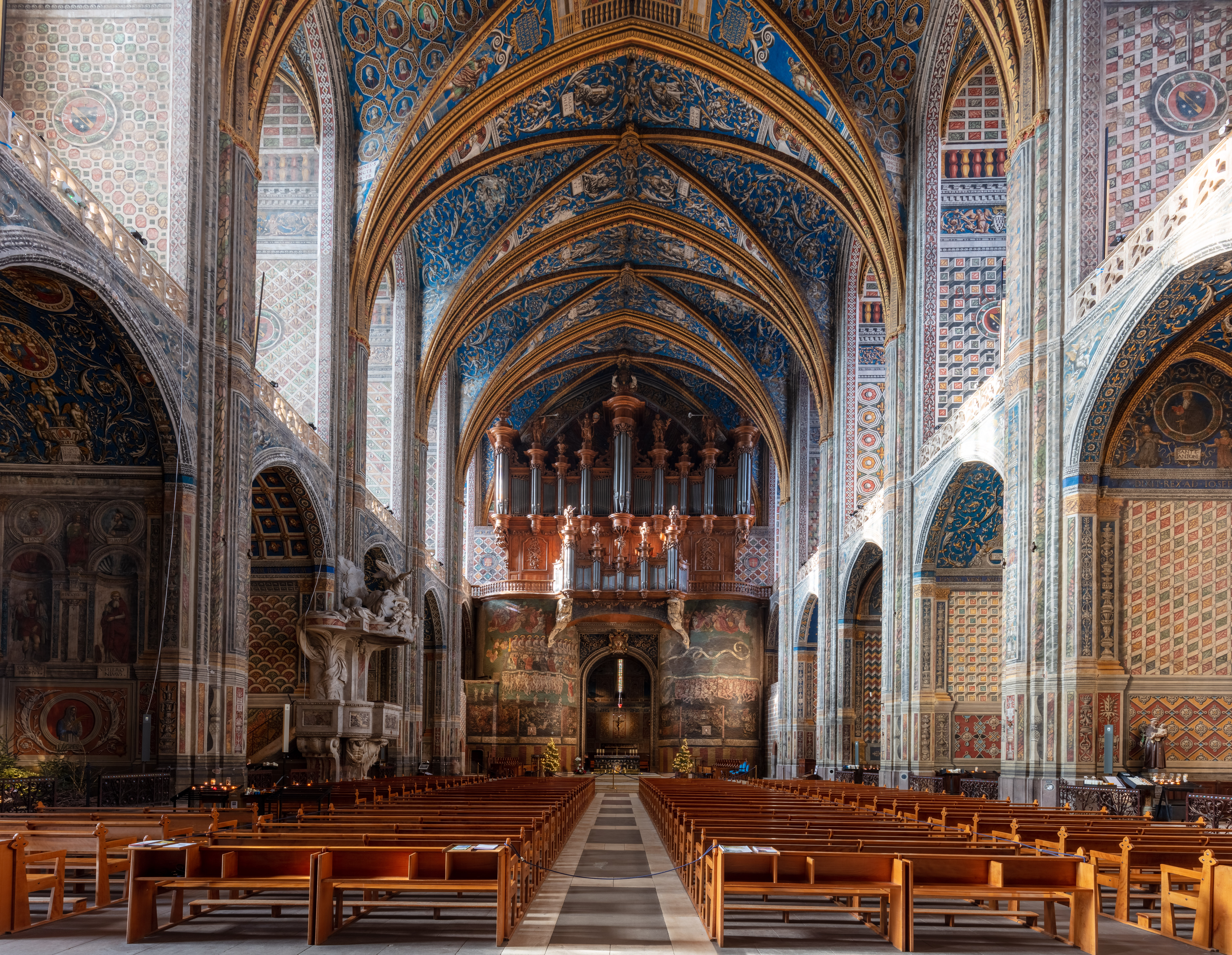
The nave looking to the west

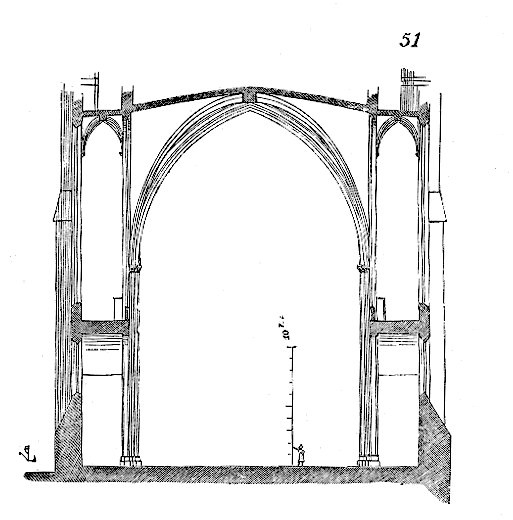
Vertical plan of the interior

The nave, where the congregation worships, and the choir, reserved for the clergy, together are 97 metres (318 ft) long, 30 metres (98 ft) high, and 19 metres (62 ft) wide. While the brick outside of the church is austere and solemn, the interior is almost exploding with color; the vaults, tribunes and walls of the chapels are entirely covered with painting and decoration, most of it painted during the Renaissance.

=== Vaults ===
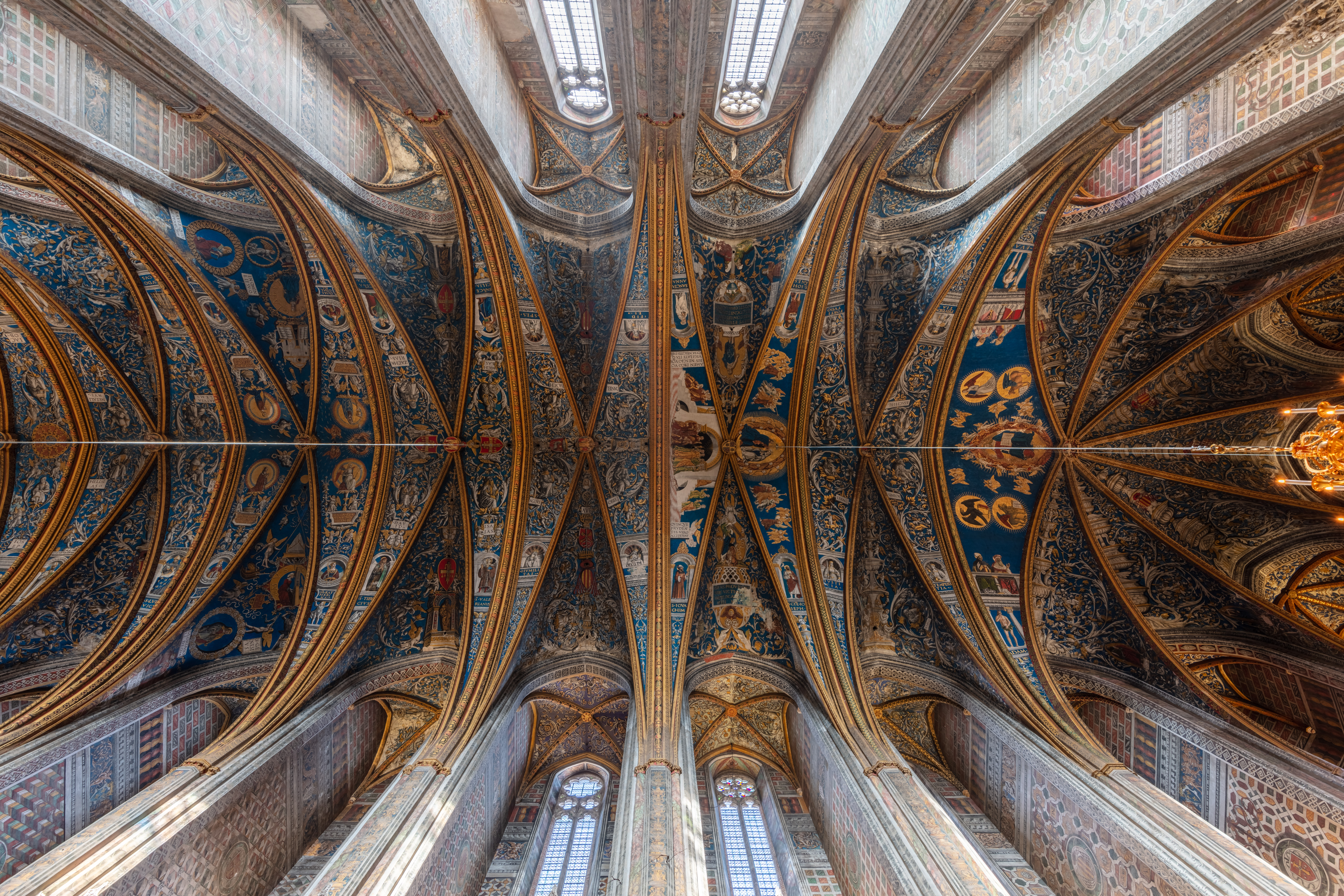
vaults of the choir

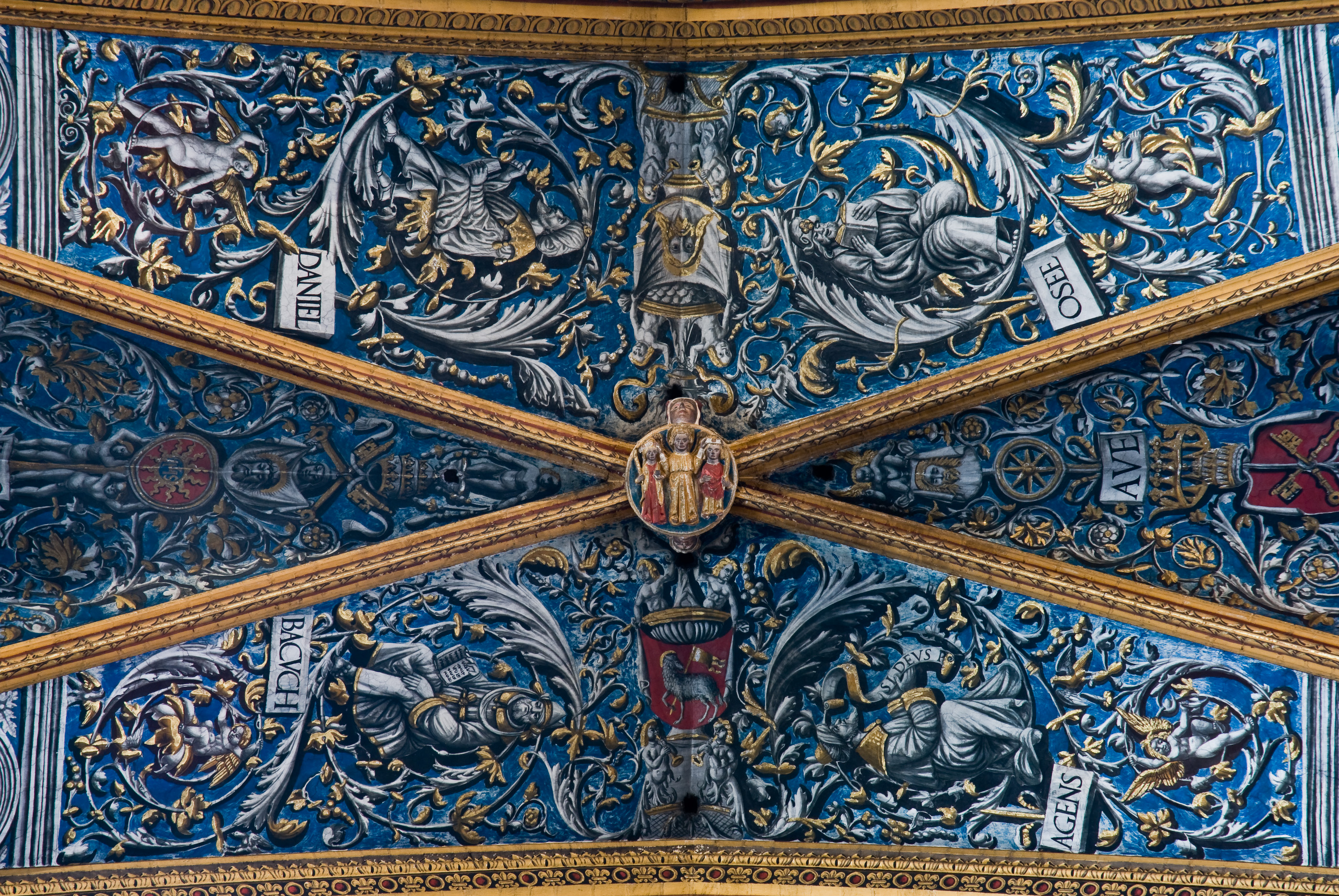
One of the rib vaults of the choir painted between 1509 and 1512

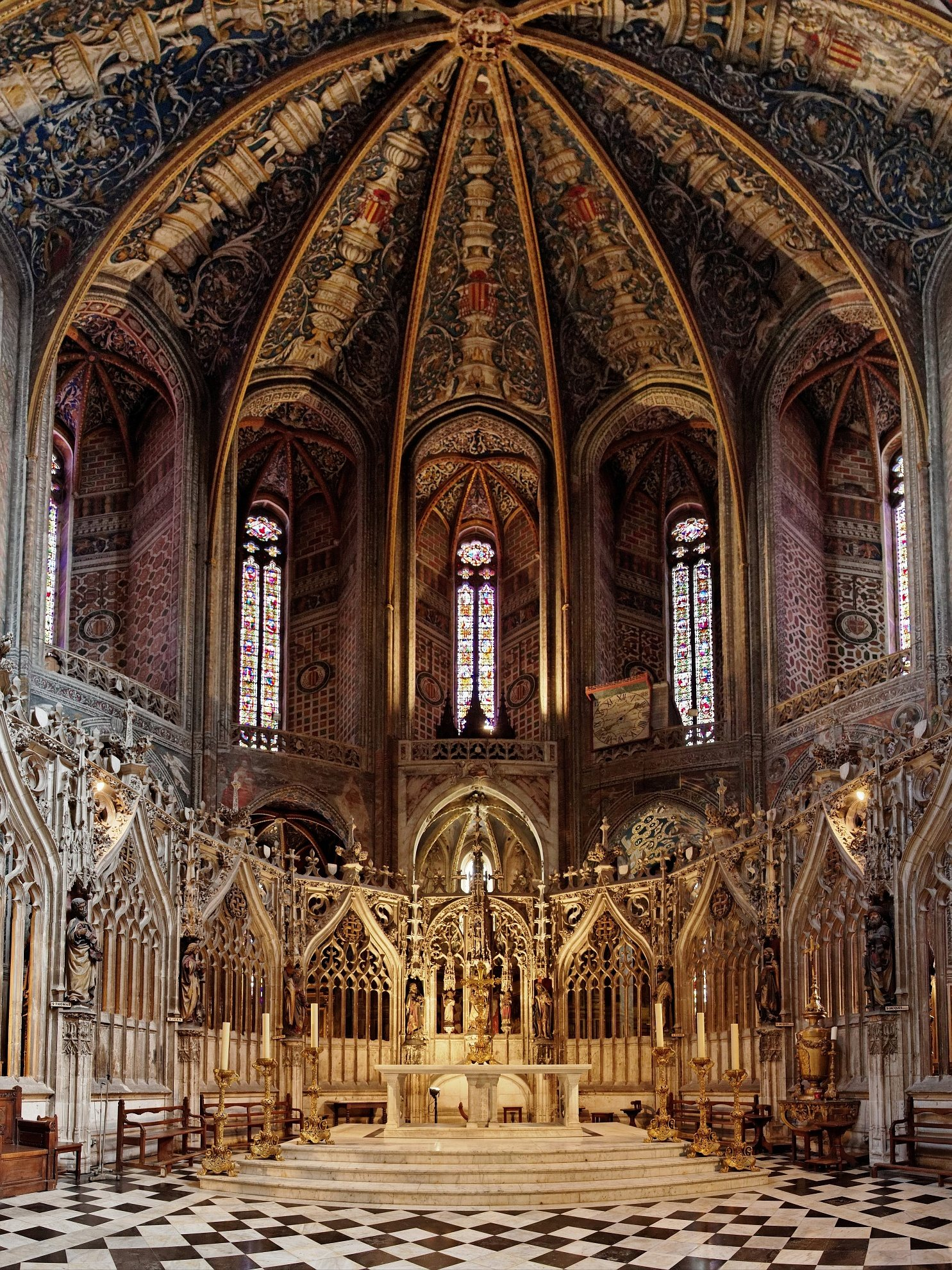
Vaults of the apse at the east end

=== The rood screen ===
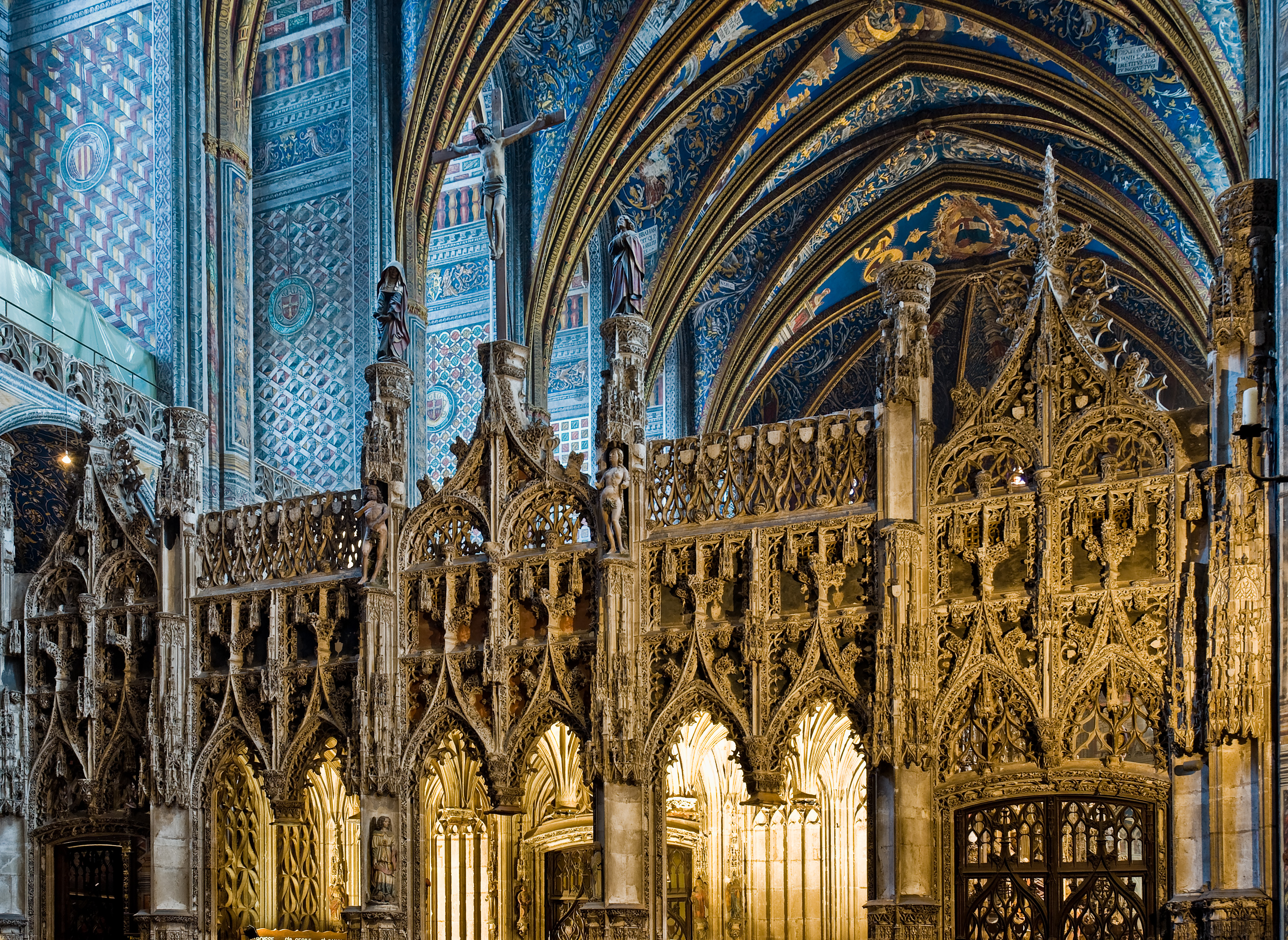
Exterior of the rood screen, viewed from the nave

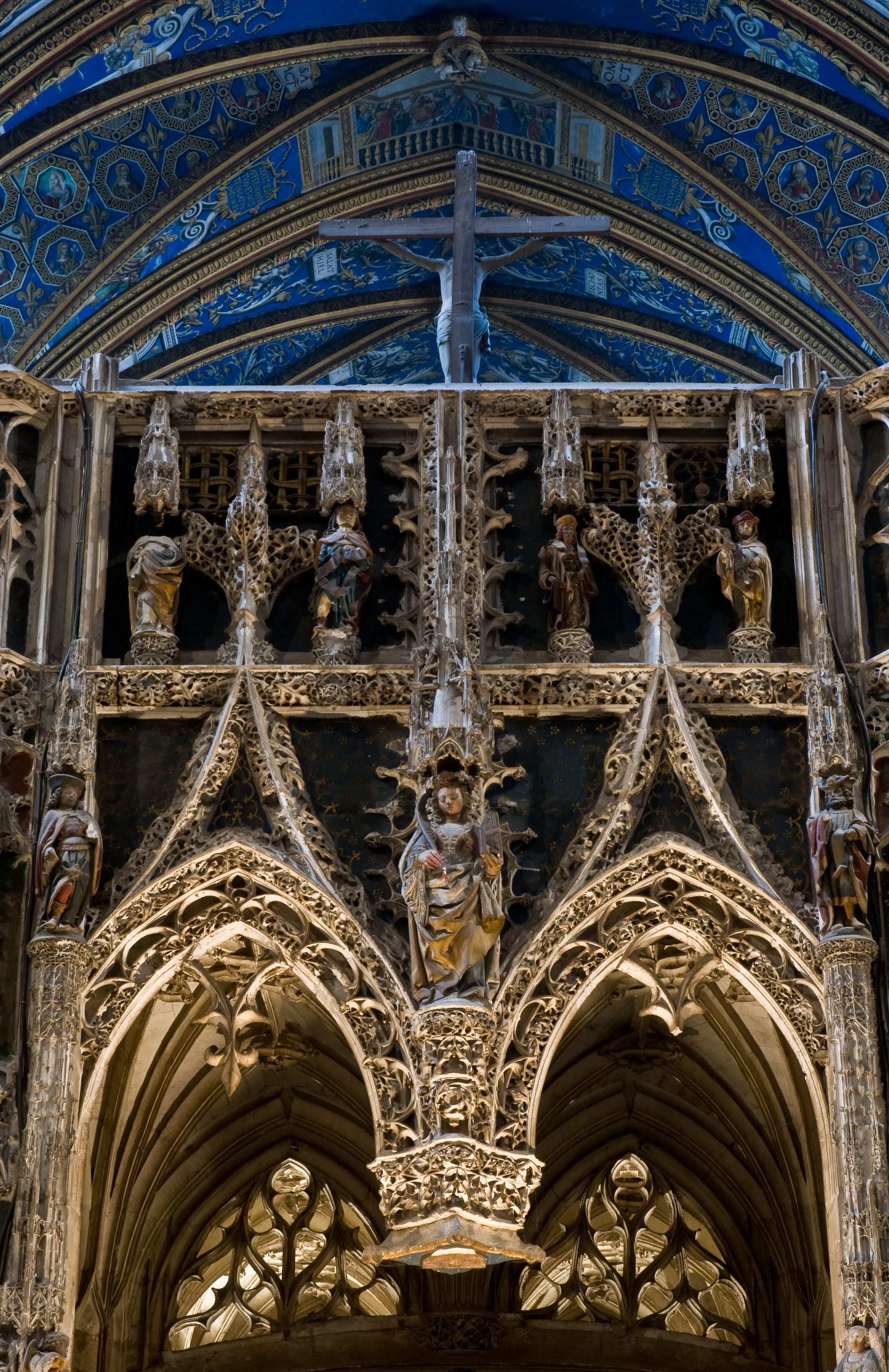
Detail of the choir screen

The choir is the portion of the interior at the east end reserved for the members of the clergy. It has some of the most elaborate decoration, combining sculpture, painting, ironwork, and wood carving. Every portion of the choir, from the choir stalls and floors to the walls, tribunes and vaults above, is elaborately decorated and painted or colored.

The rood screen, or jubé, is a decorative fence that separates the choir from the nave and is located about midway in the cathedral. Its function was originally to allow the clergy to pray and meditate in a quiet atmosphere, undisturbed by people circulating in the nave or other parts of the church. They were very common in French Gothic cathedrals until the 16th century, when most were removed as part of widespread reform of church doctrine begun by the Council of Trent (1545–1563), intended to combat the rise of Protestantism, and make the interior of churches more open and welcoming. The Albi screen was kept, but then was threatened with destruction during the French Revolution as an example of "fanaticism and superstition". Many of the statues on the outer face were smashed, but the interior of the screen survived intact. (See history above).

The rood screen is made of filigree stone work topped with a group of polychrome wooden statues representing Christ on the cross, the Virgin Mary and Saint John. These statues were not original to the cathedral; they probably came from the former Church of the Cordeliers and were installed in the 19th century.

=== Choir enclosure and choir stalls ===
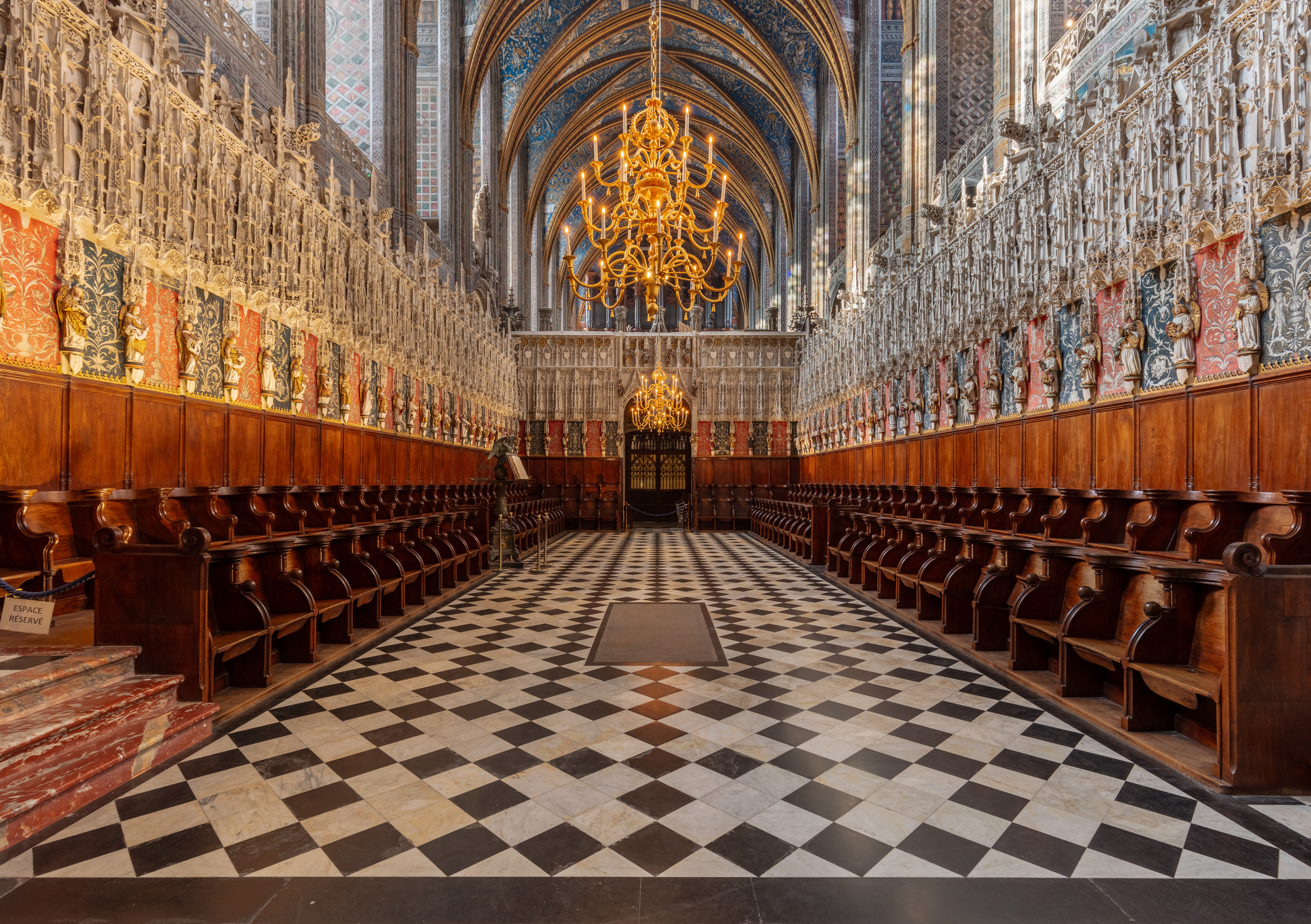
Interior of the choir enclosure and rood screen

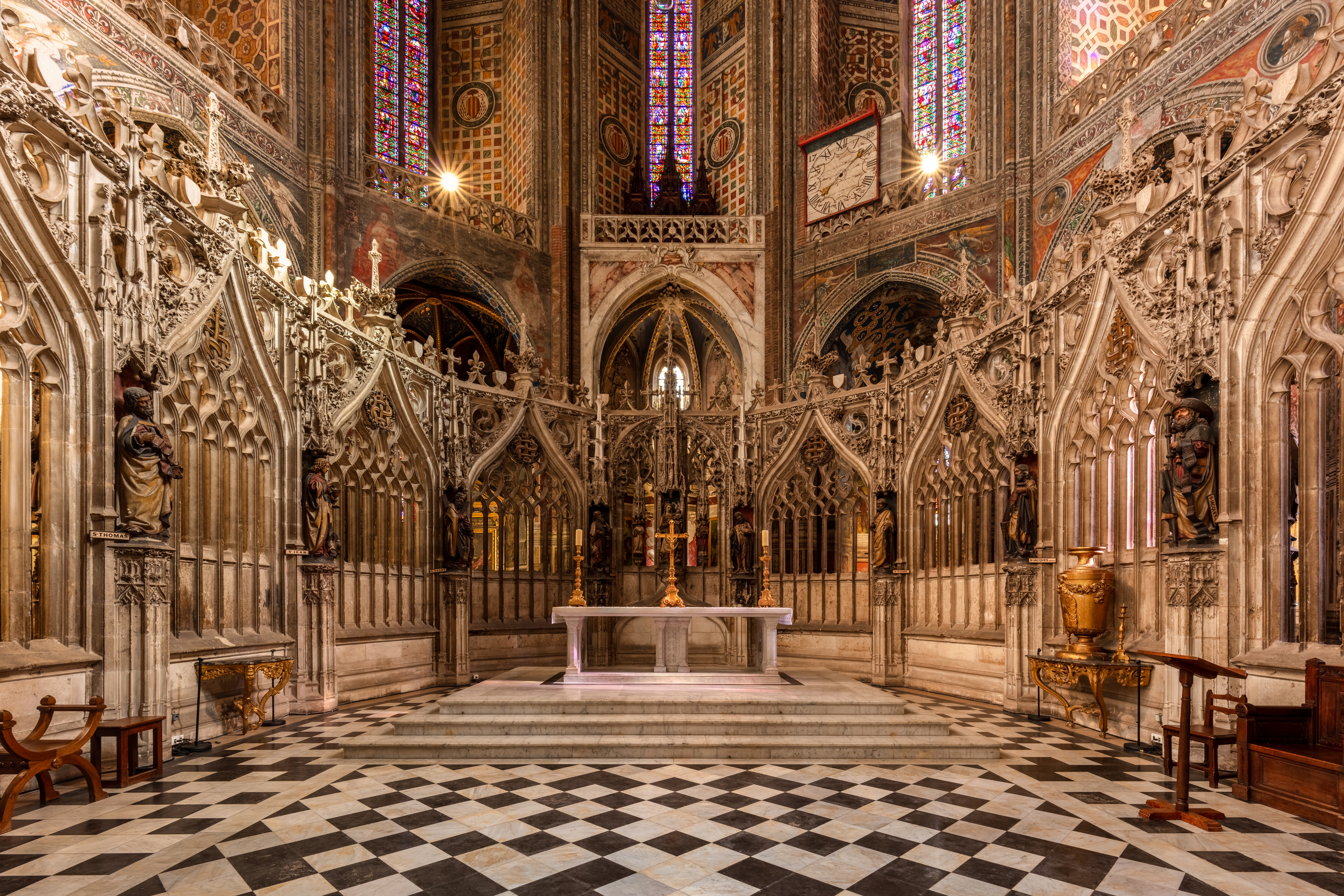
The altar and choir enclosure

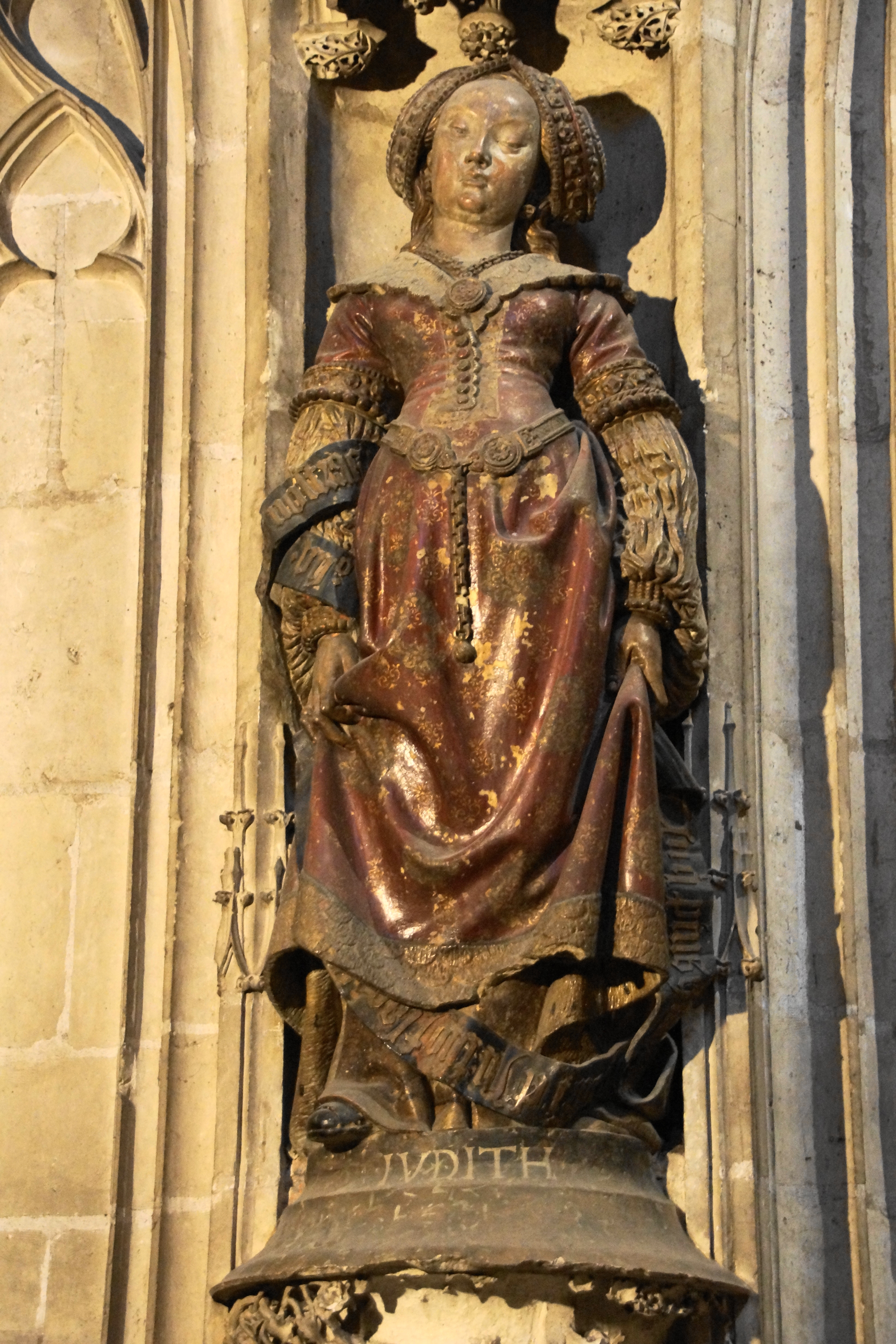
Statue of Judith, on the enclosure exterior

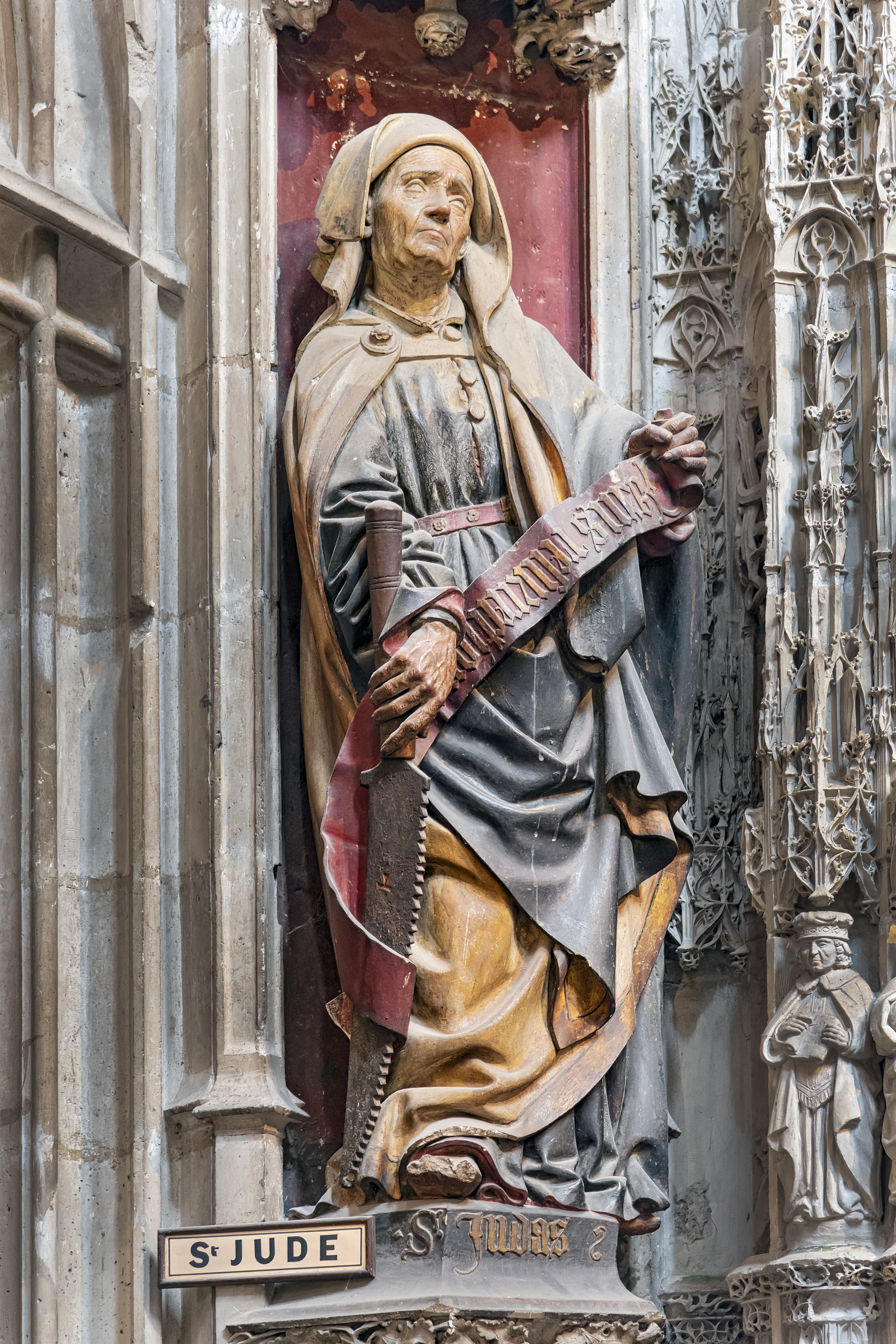
Figure of Saint Jude on the choir enclosure

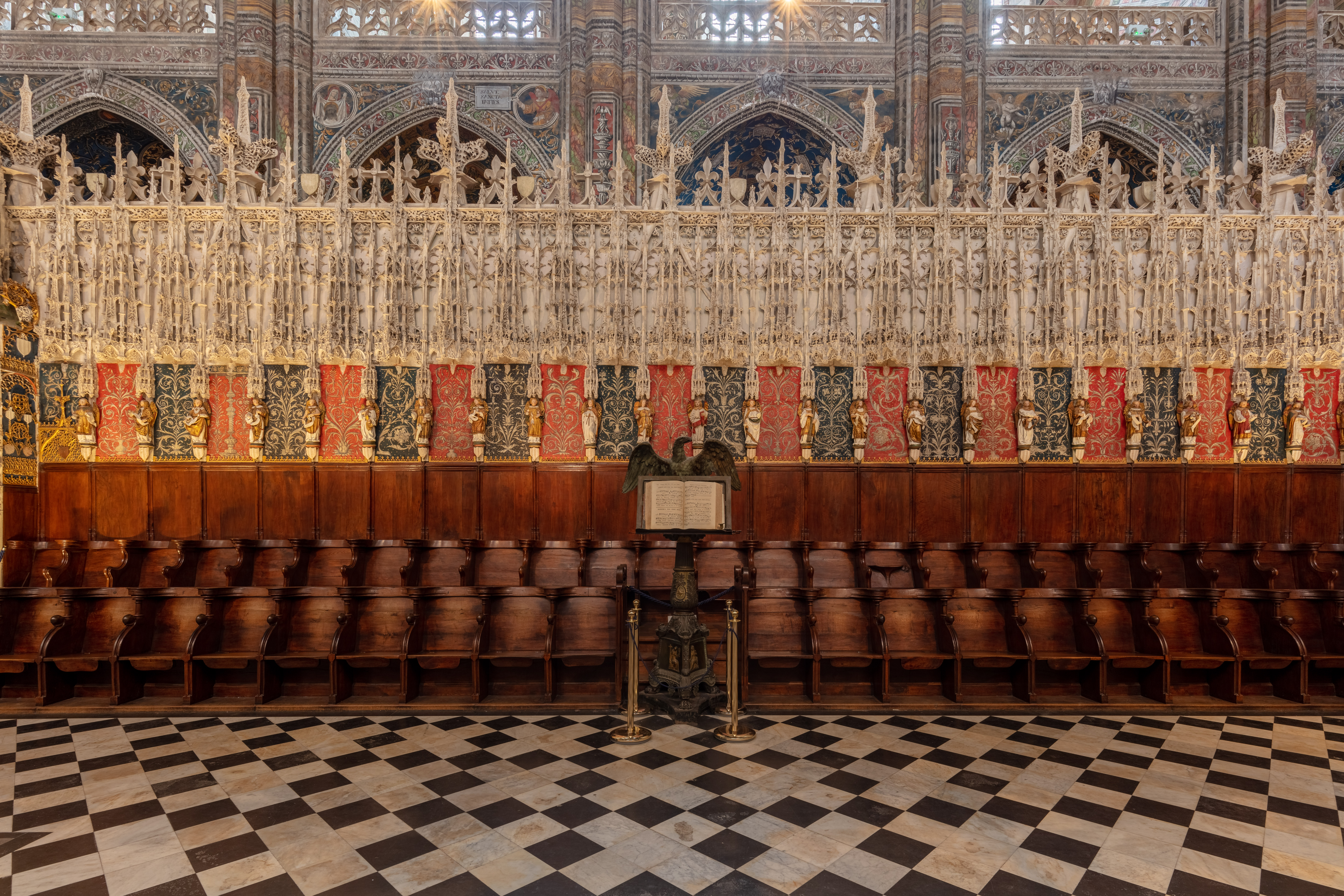
Decoration of the choir stalls

While much of the sculpture on the outer face of the rood screen was damaged, that on the interior of the screen is almost completely intact, and features sculpture of the twelve apostles and two angels around the Virgin Mary. They are carved of stone and delicately colored. Seventy-two statues of angels decorate other parts of the screen, surrounding the figure of Saint Cecilia, the patron saint of the cathedral.

The elaborate sculptural screen, partly openwork and partly closed, surrounds the interior space of the choir. This enclosure was built between 1474 and 1482 by Bishop Louis I d'Amboise. His coat of arms of two angels carrying his emblem is displayed at the side entrances of the screen. A study in 2012 discovered that the sculpture was originally painted in blues and reds, but was modified in the 19th century to brighter greens and orange-reds, to harmonise with the more recent painted decoration. Following that discovery, with the permission of the Commission of National Monuments, the sculpture was cleaned and restored as much as possible to the original gilding and colouring, and the 19th-century background colours changed to the colour of stone, to recreate the original medieval harmony.

=== Wall painting ===
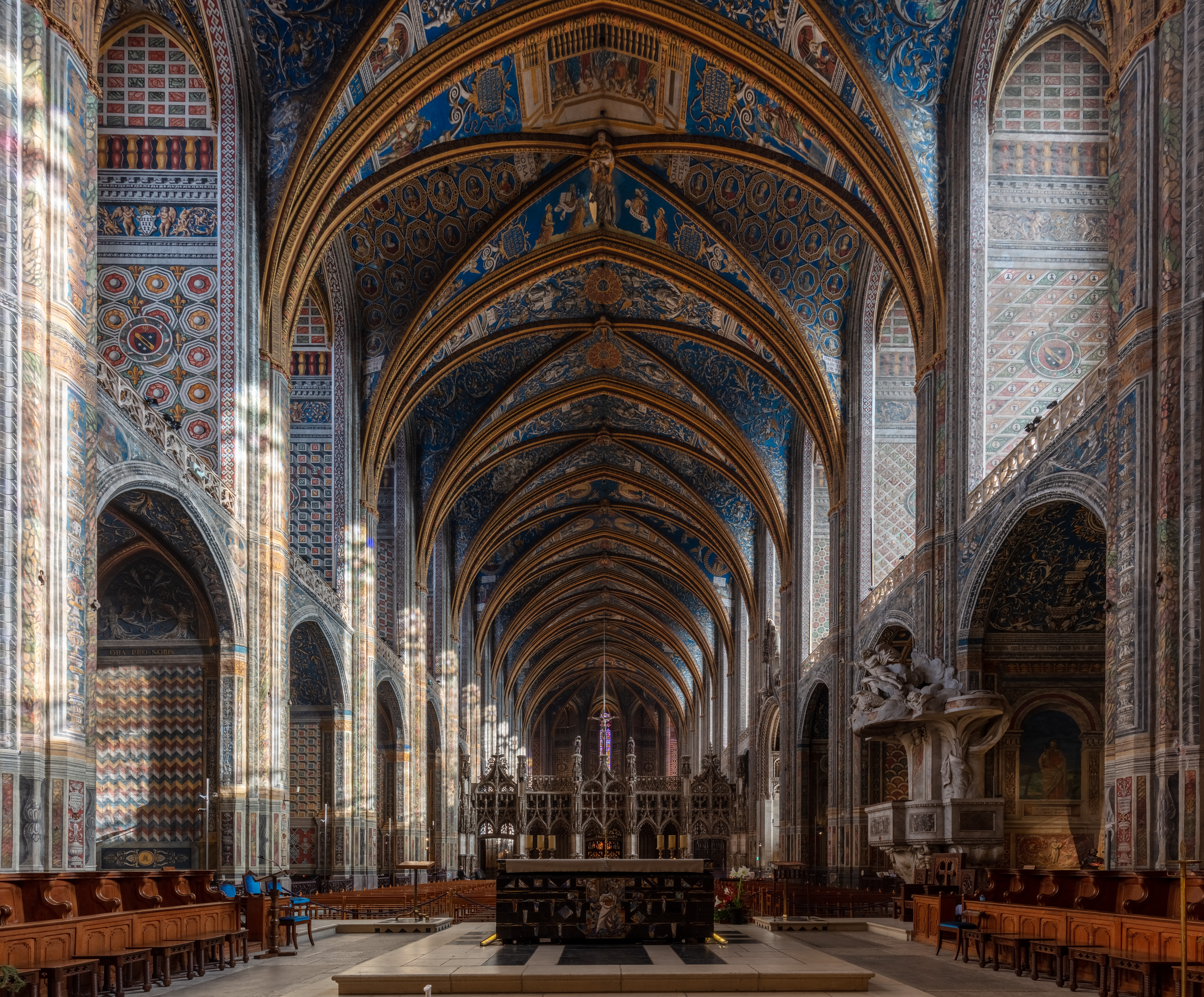
Painted in the nave

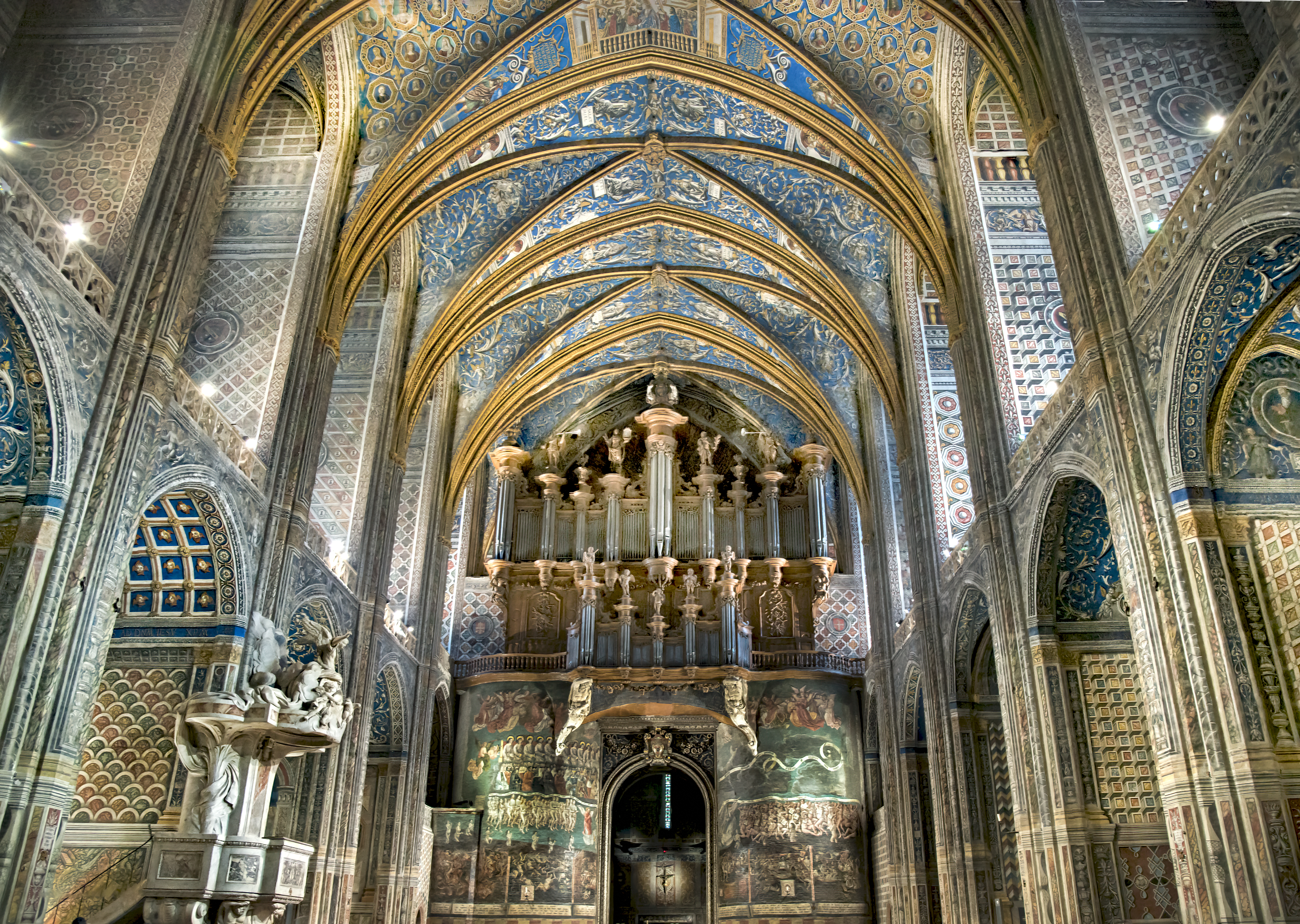
Painted tribunes of the nave

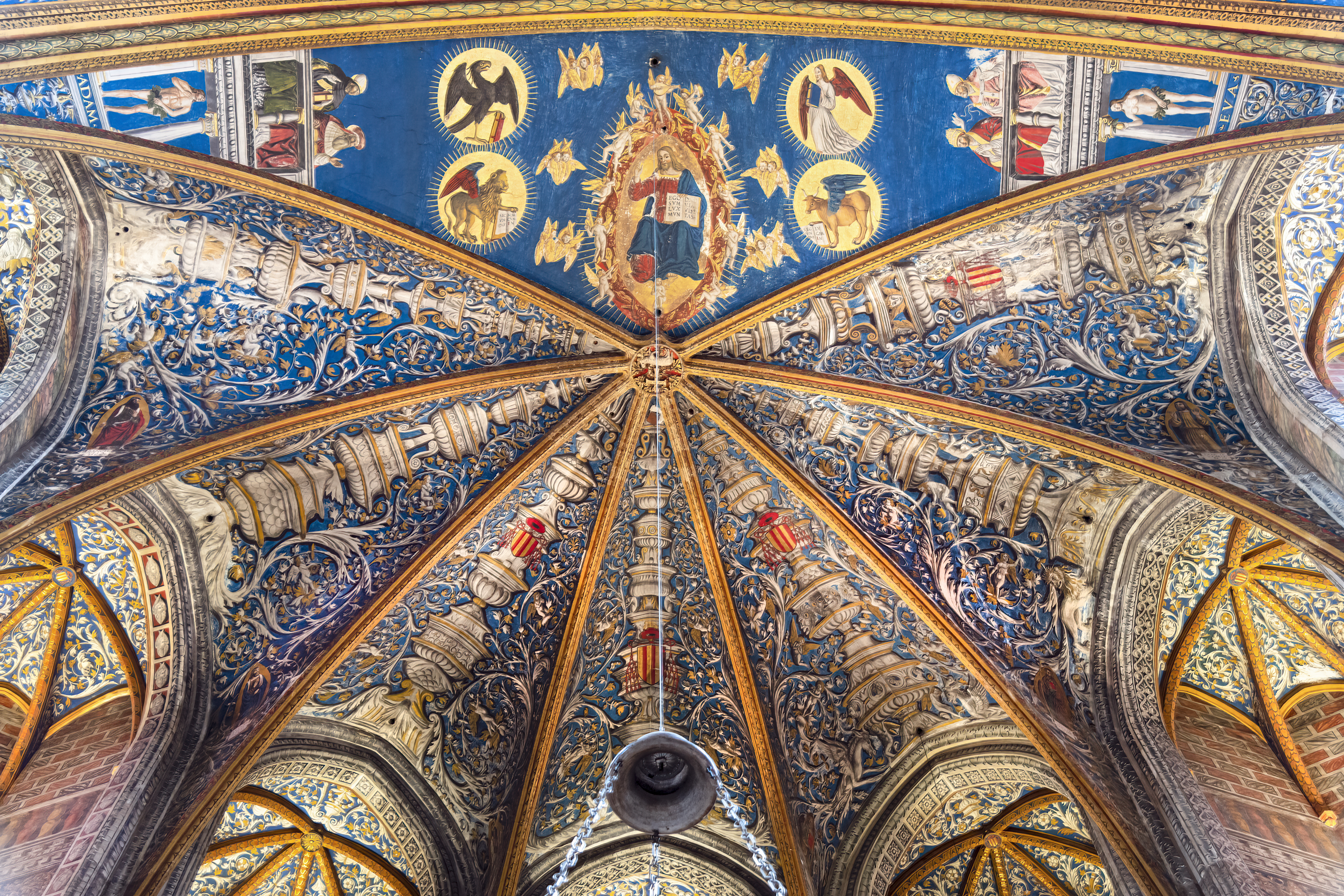
Choir ceiling

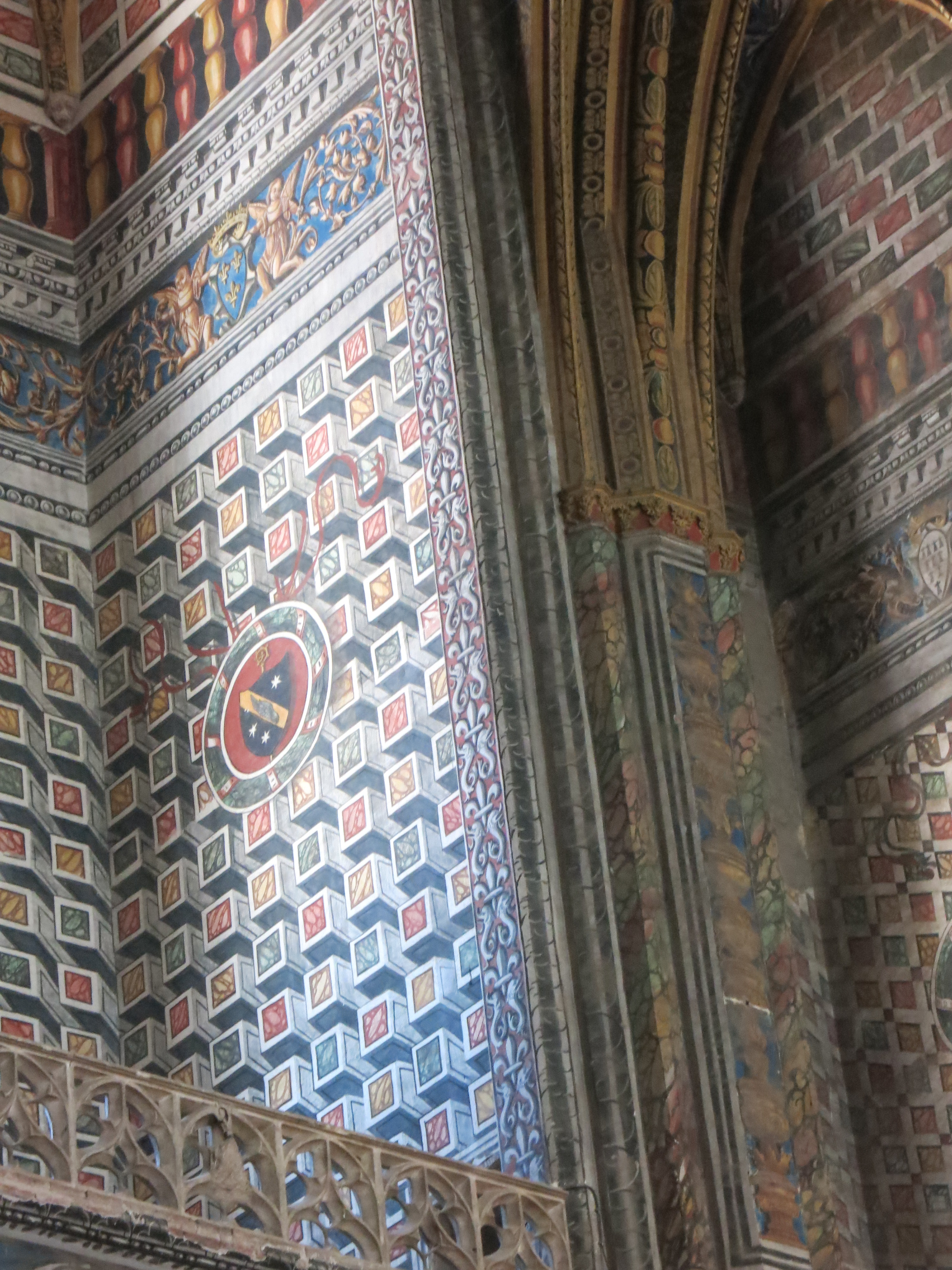
Geometric painting of the upper walls

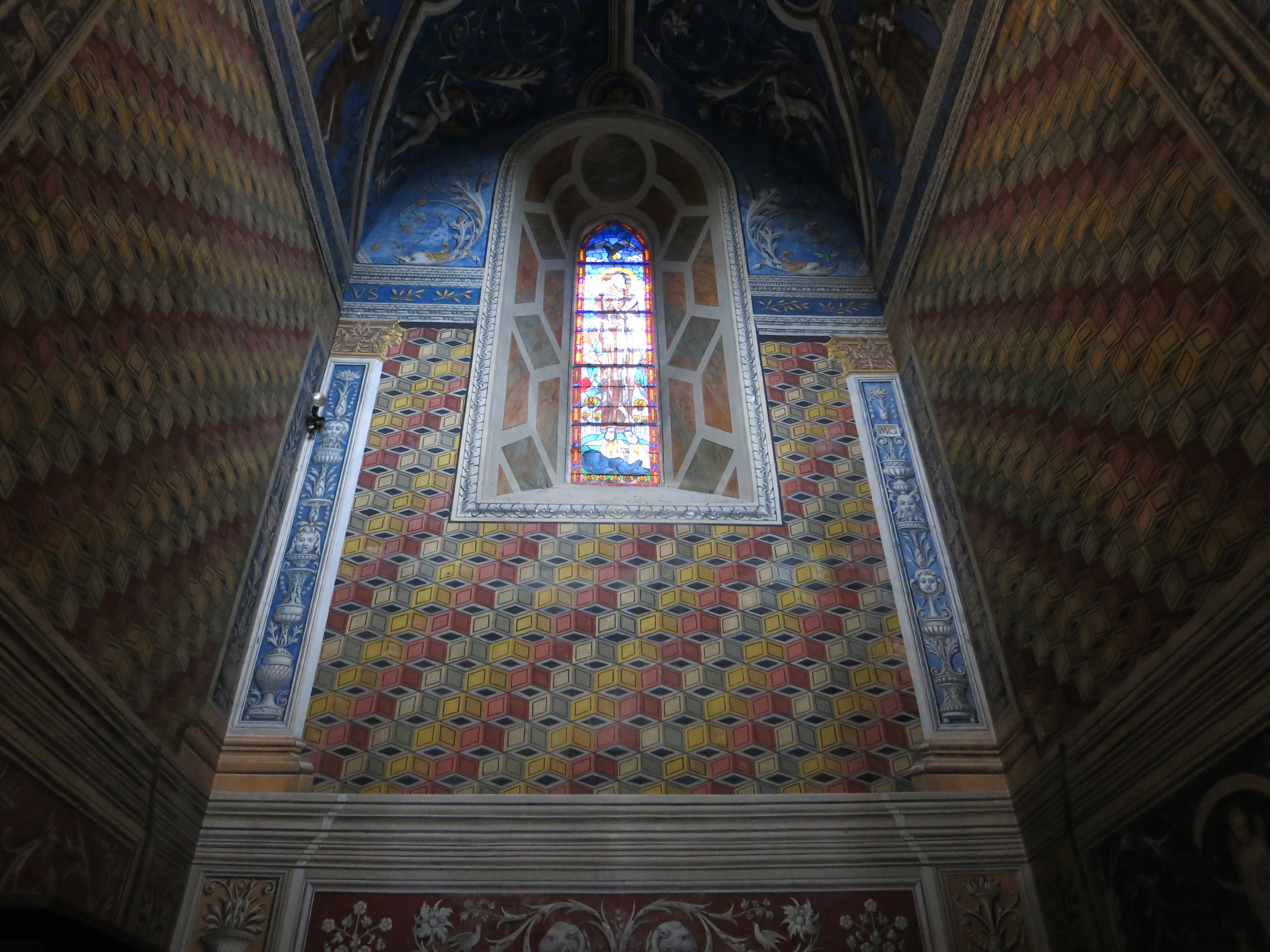
Upper wall decoration

One of the distinctive features of Albi Cathedral is the polychrome geometric painting of the tribunes and upper walls, particularly in the choir and the chapels. The geometric designs have a number of different motifs; some imitate the appearance of marble; some are divided into medallions or squares, or give the appearance of three-dimensional cubes; some have coats of arms, or painted tree branches, or false balustrades. The upper levels offer painted animals or birds inhabiting the geometric designs, in an elaborate combination of humor and fantasy.

=== Pulpit ===
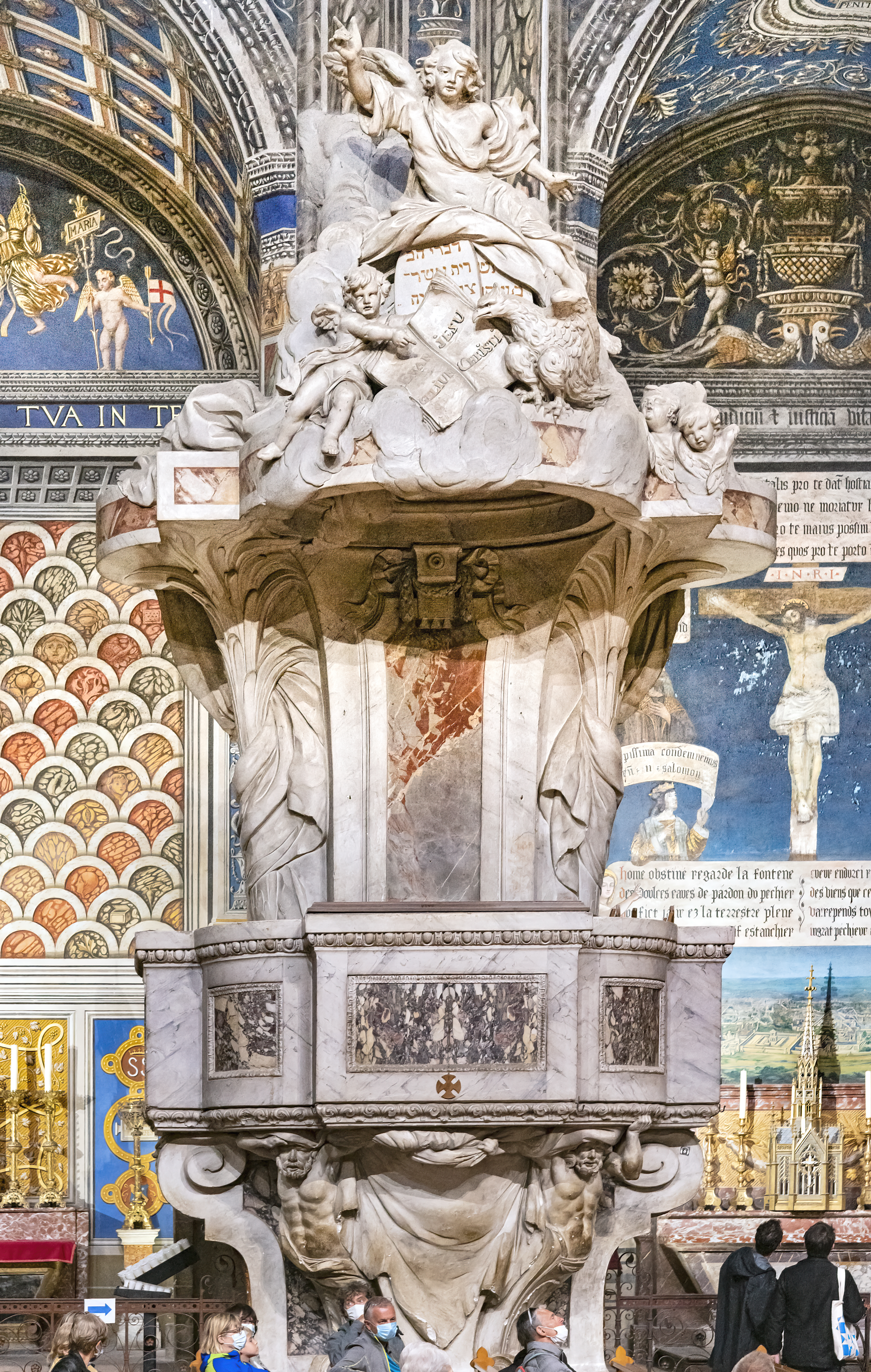
The Baroque pulpit (18th c.)

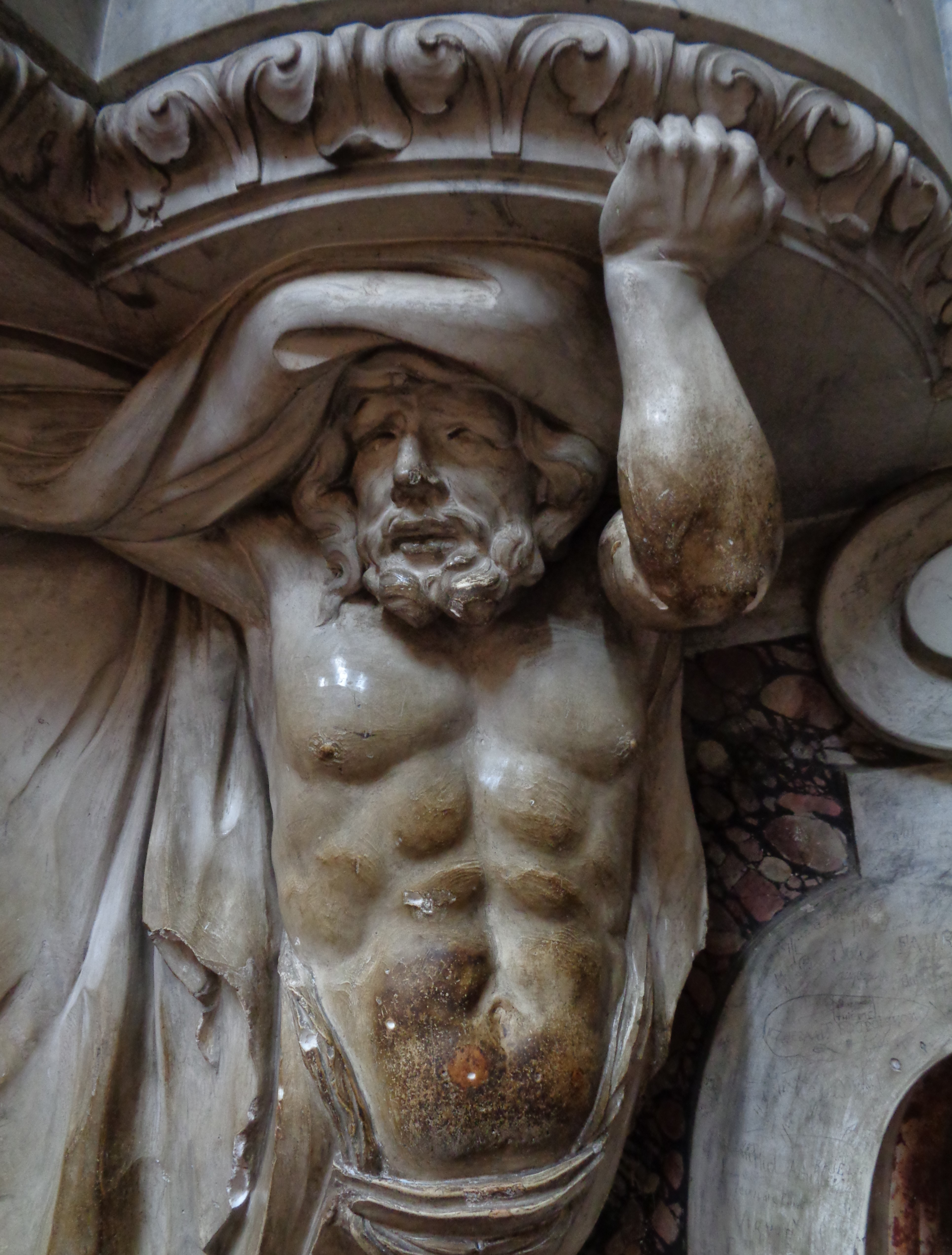
Detail of the pulpit

The Baroque pulpit in the nave was commissioned by the Cardinal Bernis, and was made between 1776 and 1779 by the Italian sculptors Mazetti and Maderni.

=== Chapels ===
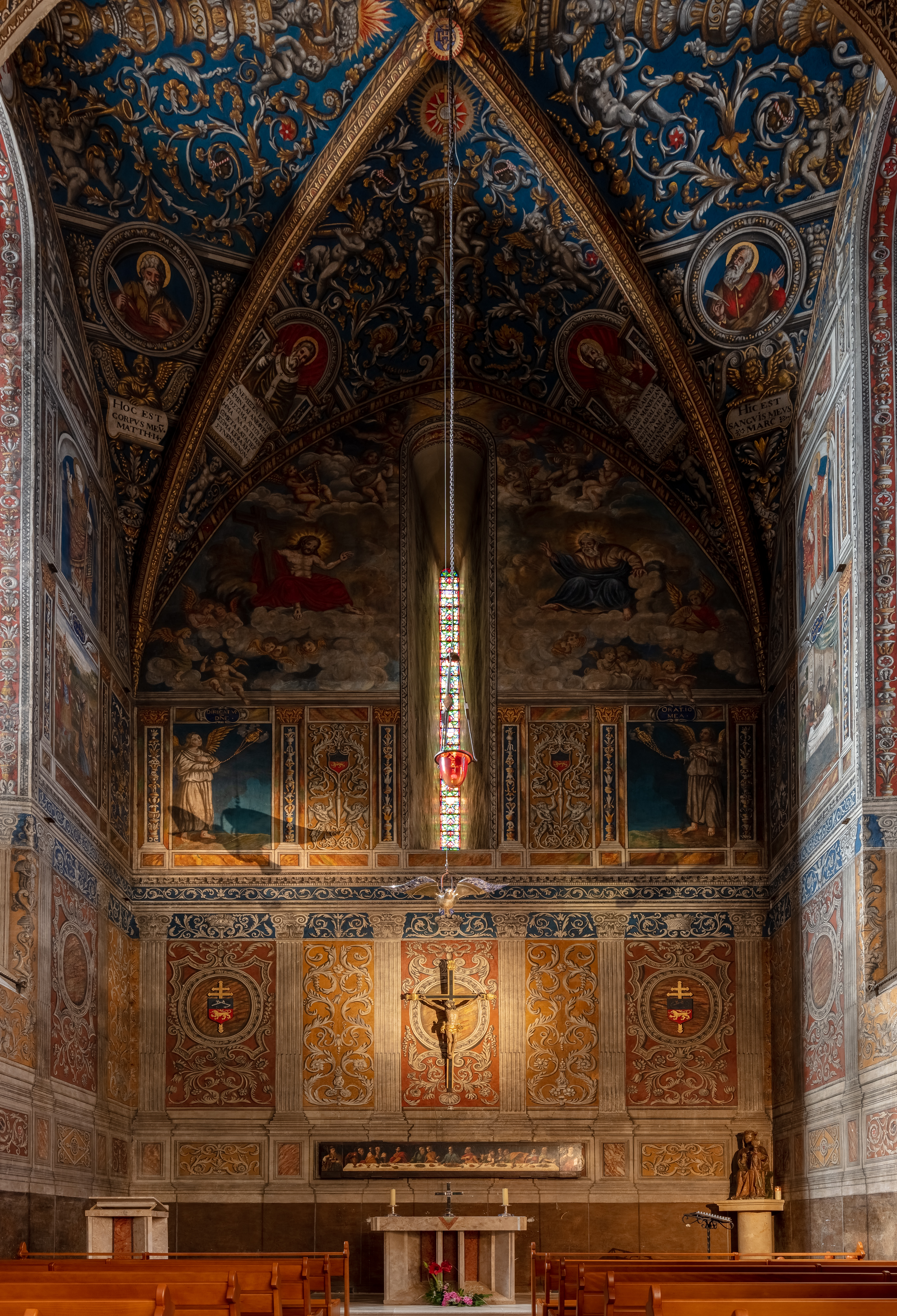
Chapel of Saint Claire, at the west end, below the "Last Judgement" Mural.

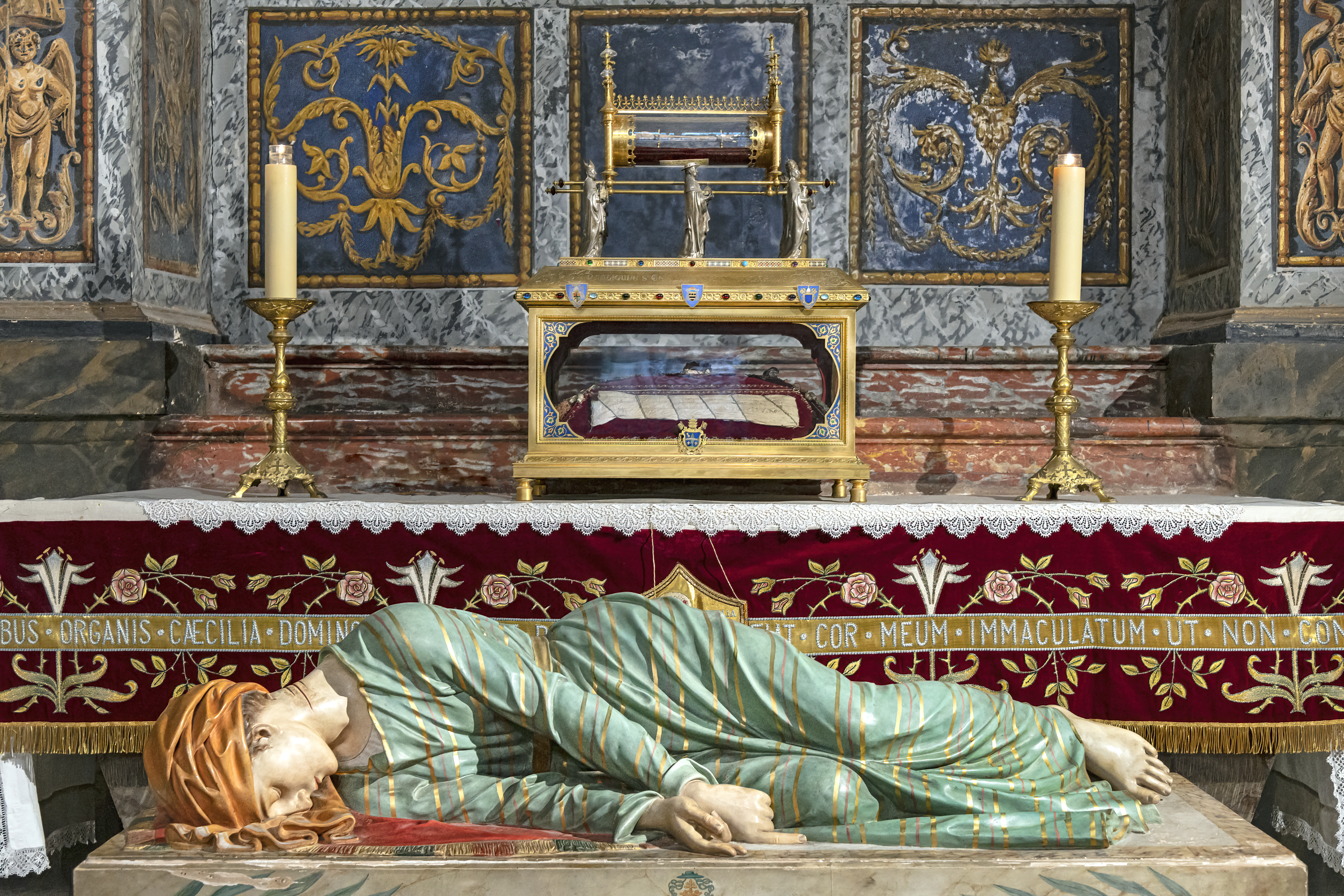
Chapel of Saint Cecile, with reliquary and a statue of the Saint

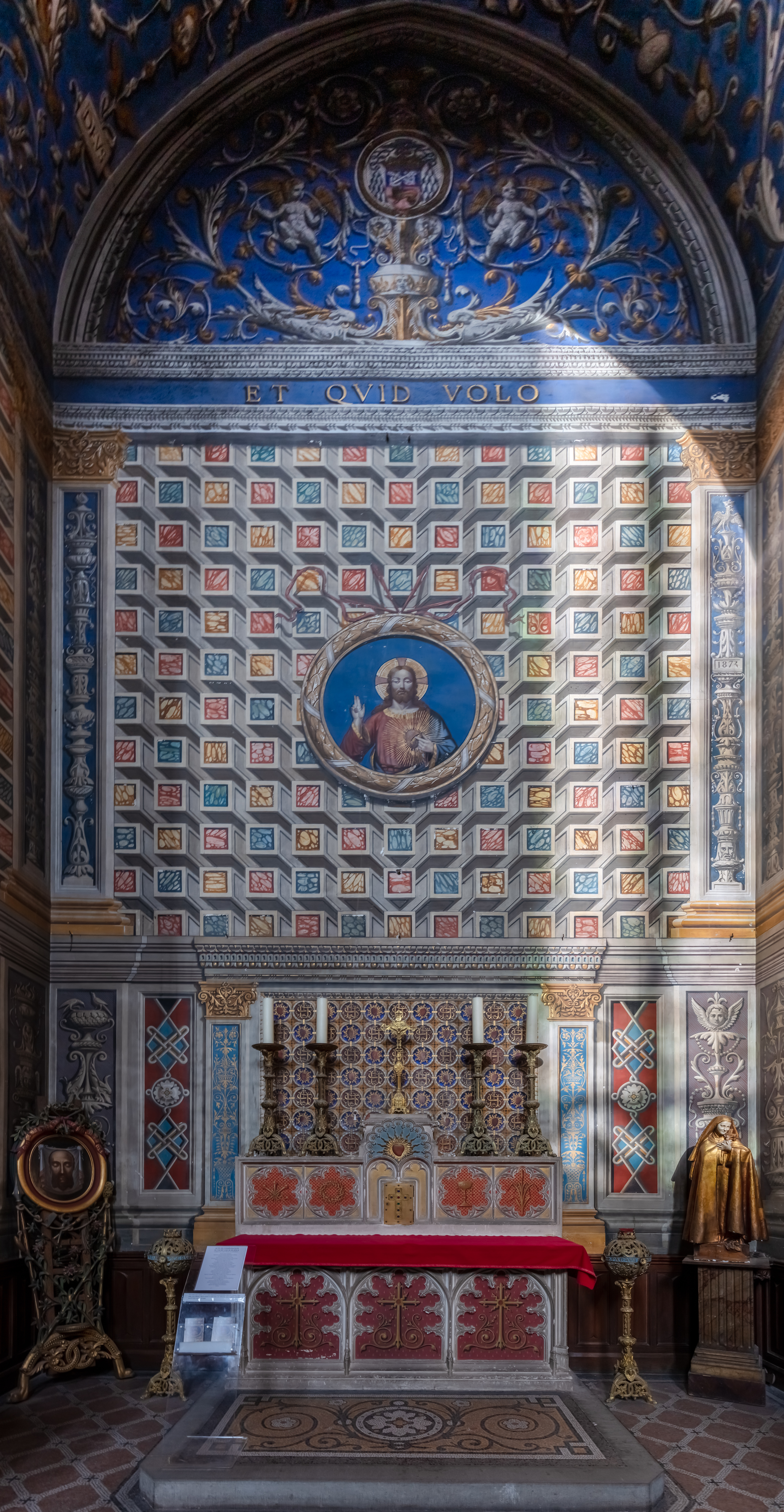
Chapel of Saint Marguerite

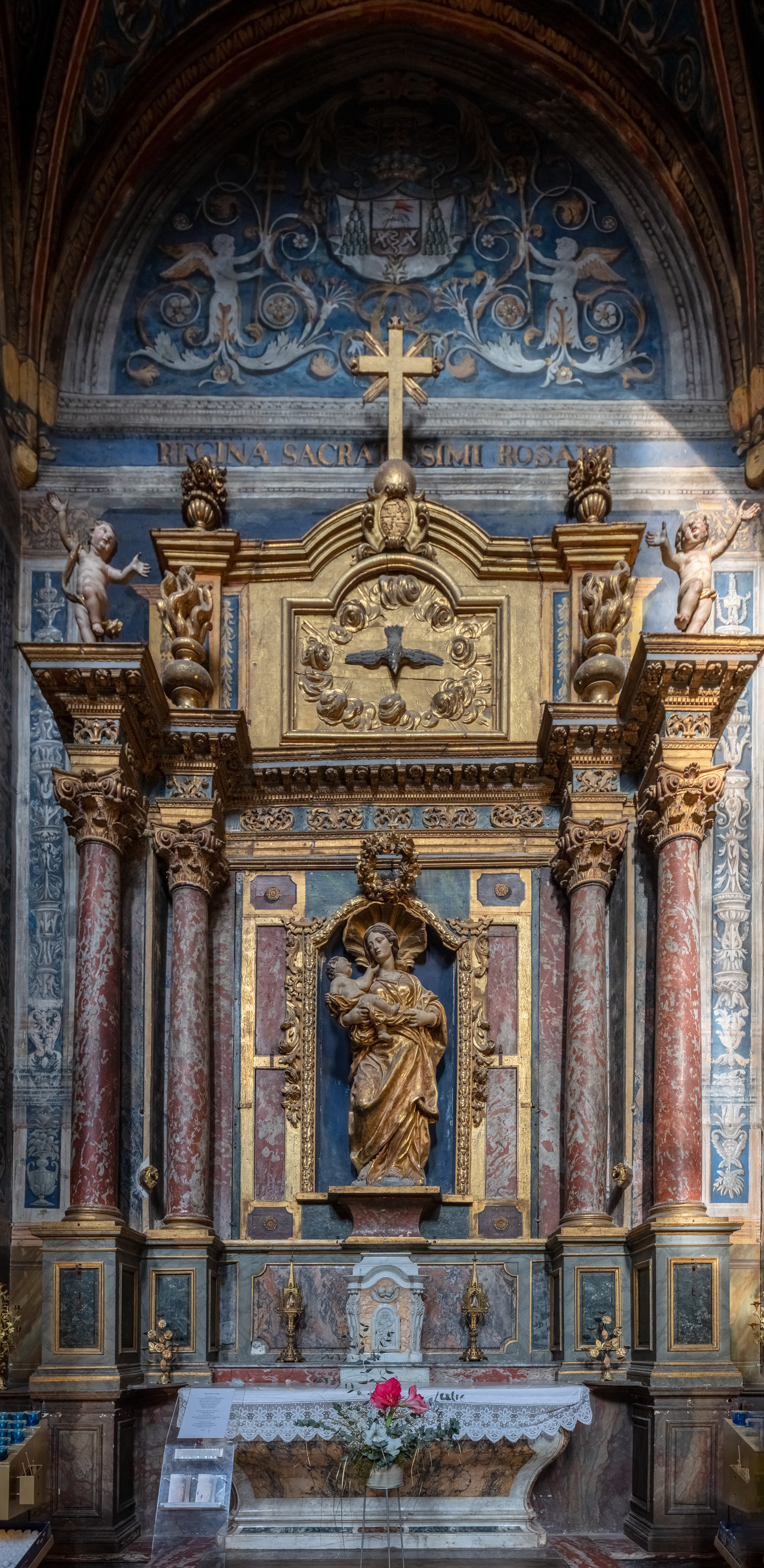
Chapel of the Nave

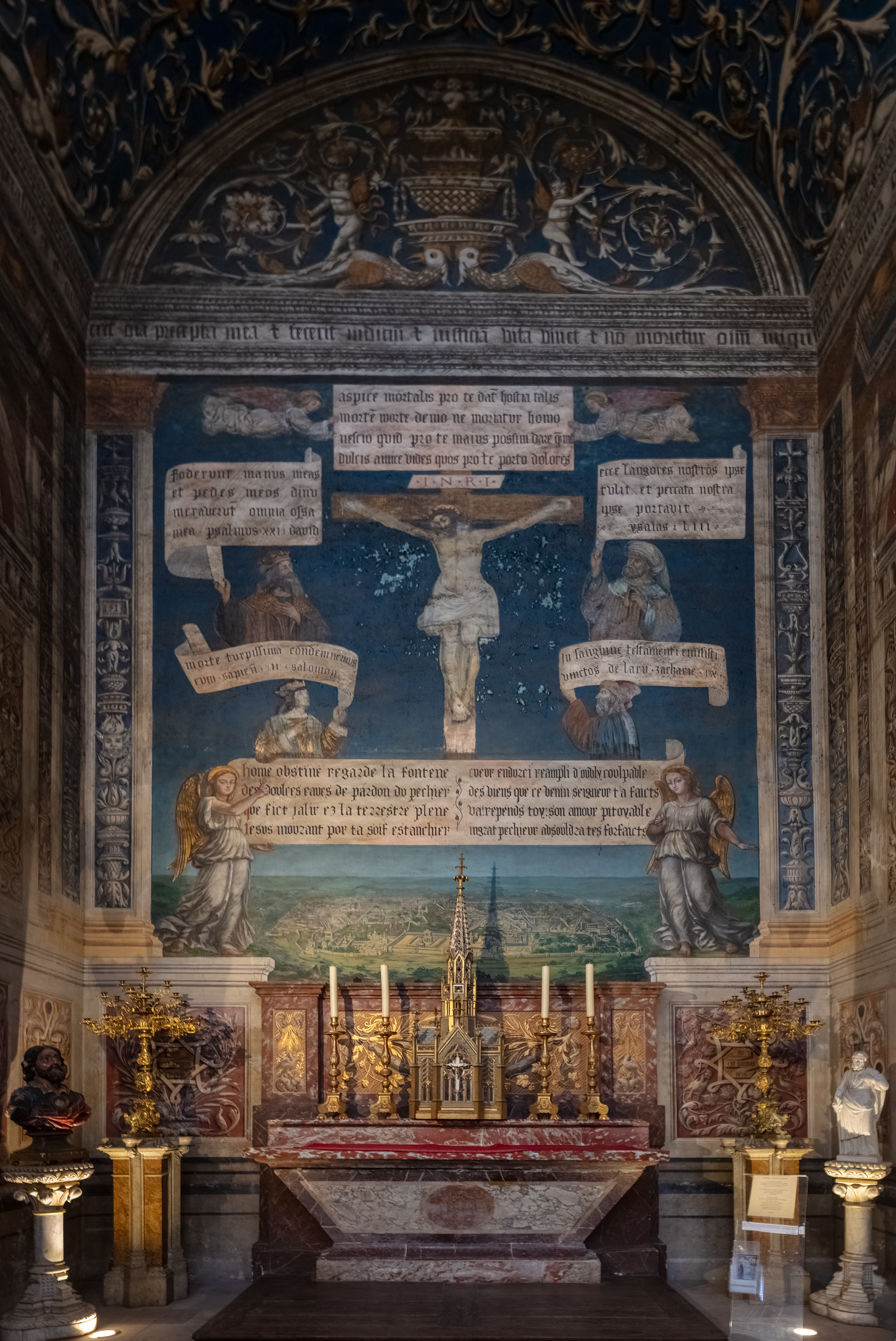
Chapel of the Nave

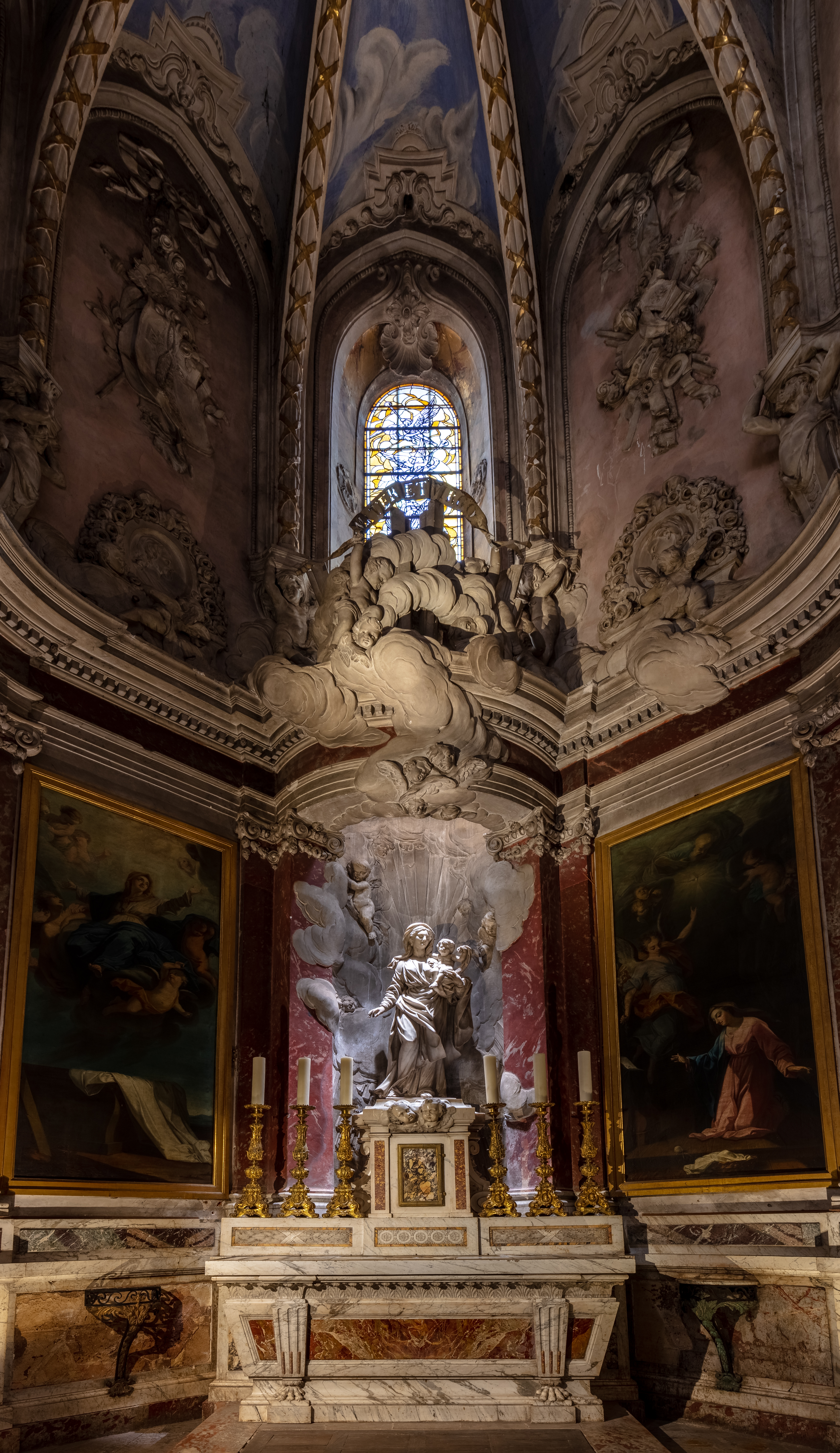
The Axis chapel, decorated by the Mazetti brothers (1777–79)

The cathedral has twelve small chapels placed between the buttresses along the sides of the nave, and an additional twelve alongside the choir, plus an additional five chapels radiating from the apse at the east end, and another, the Chapelle Sainte-Claire, at the west end. The side chapels in the nave received overhead galleries in the 15th century.

The chapels were frequently redecorated and repainted in the following years, causing Eugène Viollet-le-Duc to complain in 1841 that "Almost all of chapels were ruined; paintings were nailed over the murals, and clumsy restorations were made by the whitewashers." He made substantial restorations, particularly in the elaborate floor-to-ceiling murals in the Chapelle de la Sainte-Croix (The Chapel of the Holy Cross). The nine scenes of the mural depict the story of how fragments of the true cross were discovered at Rome and given to the Emperor Constantine, allowing him to defeat the barbarian chieftain Maxence, and how later the nails used in the Crucifixion were recovered and given to Saint Helen.

The Chapelle Saint-Clair, is a square chapel tucked into the architecture of the west facade at the base of the tower at the end of the 17th century. It is located directly behind the medieval fresco of the Last Judgement, and the builder of the chapel, Bishop Le Goux de la Berchère, destroyed a central of the fresco to give the chapel a larger opening, and installed an altar to match the main altar at the other end of the church.

The Chapel of Notre Dame and Saint Cecile is the axis chapel at the very east end of the cathedral. Its decoration was created between 1777 and 1779 by the Italian artist Jacques Antoine Mazetti, who established a studio at Avignon with his brother Bernard Virgile and the painter Maderni. The central feature is a marble statue of the Virgin Mary from the 18th century, with four paintings depicting scenes from the Virgin's life by the Toulouse painter François Fauré. Behind the Virgin is a "Gloire", or Glory, a halo surrounding the Virgin, filled with angels and other figures. The interior chapel is decorated with coloured and moulded stucco.

=== Paintings – The Last Judgement fresco ===
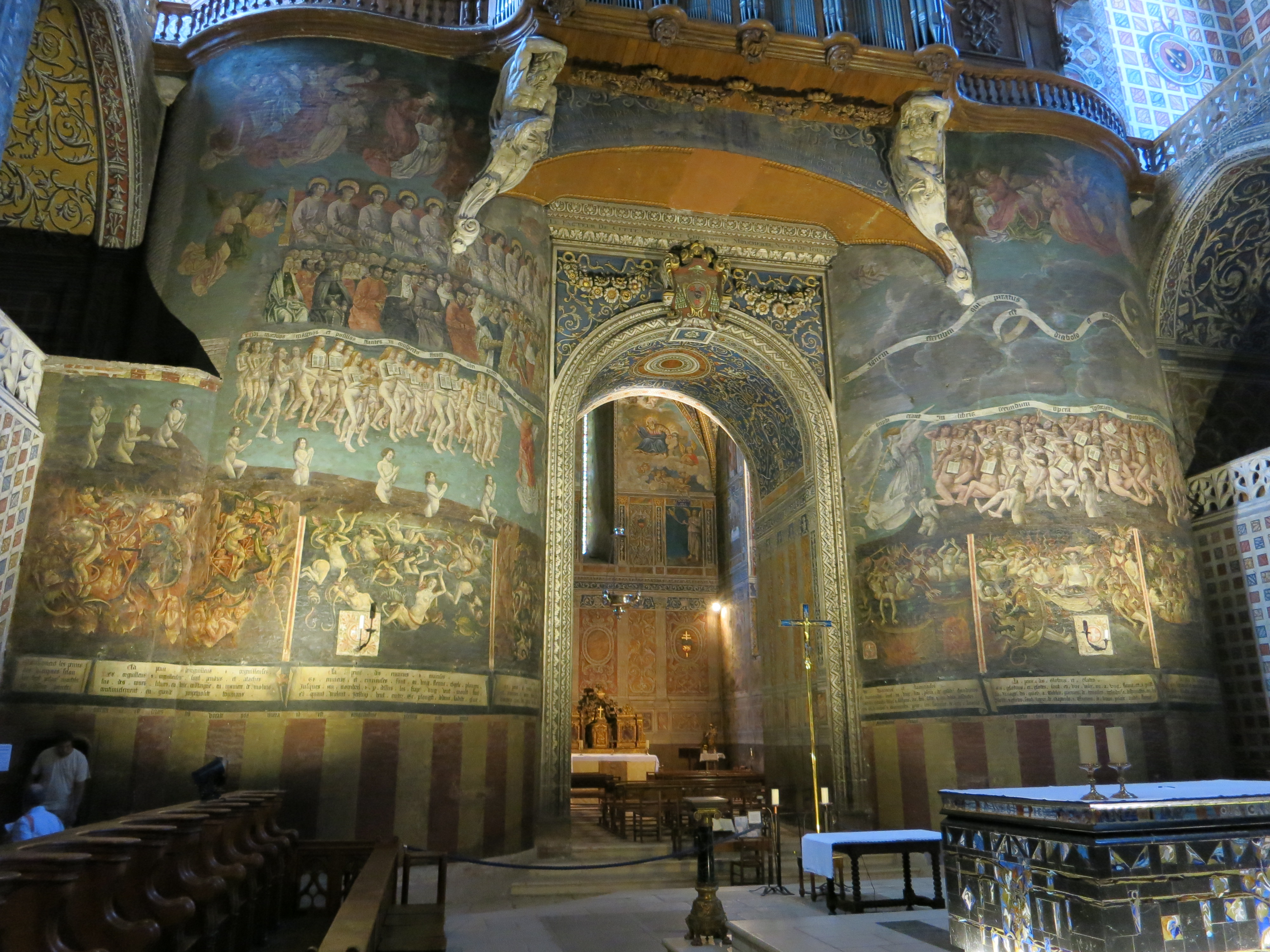
"The Last Judgement" fresco

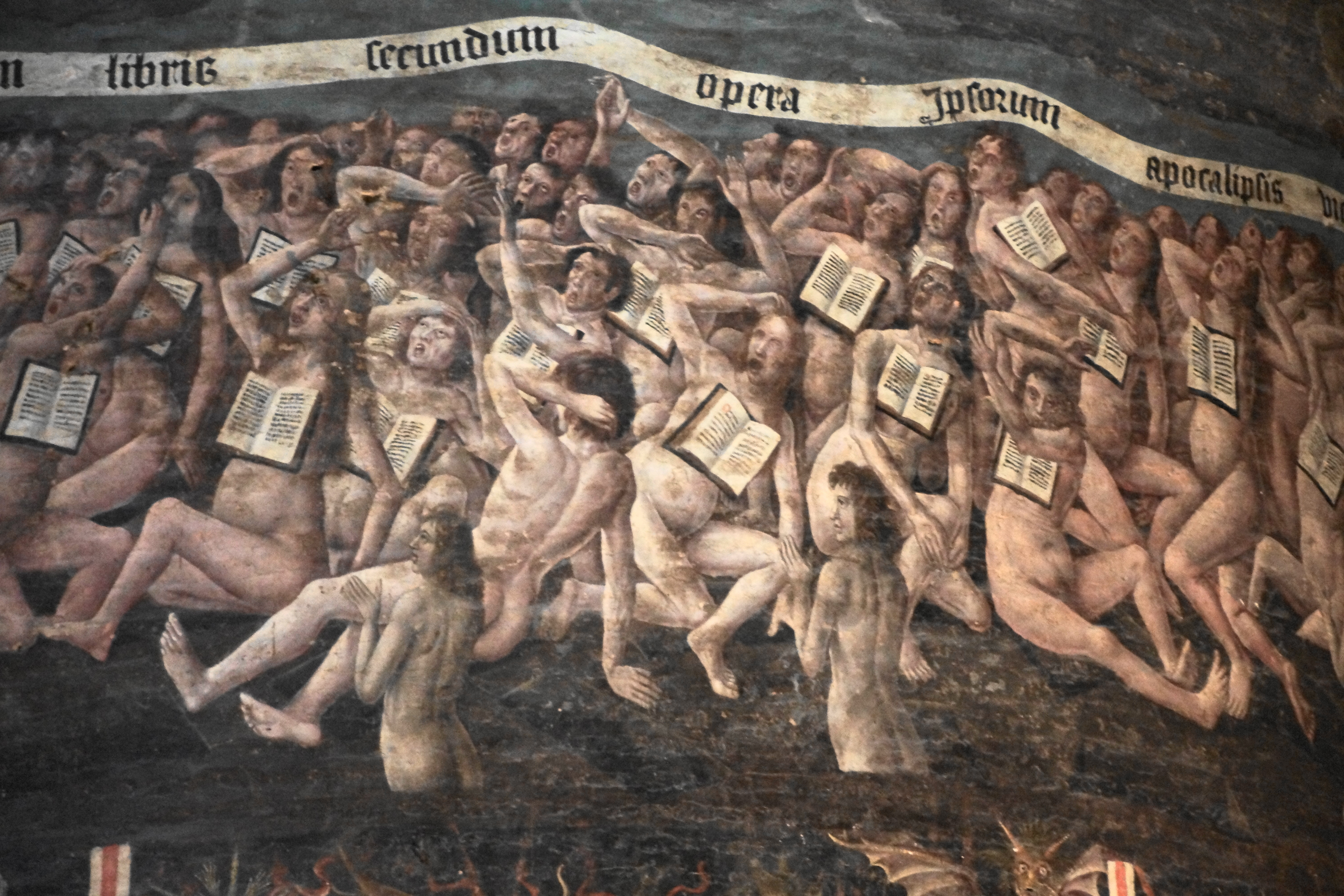
Sinners awaiting judgement

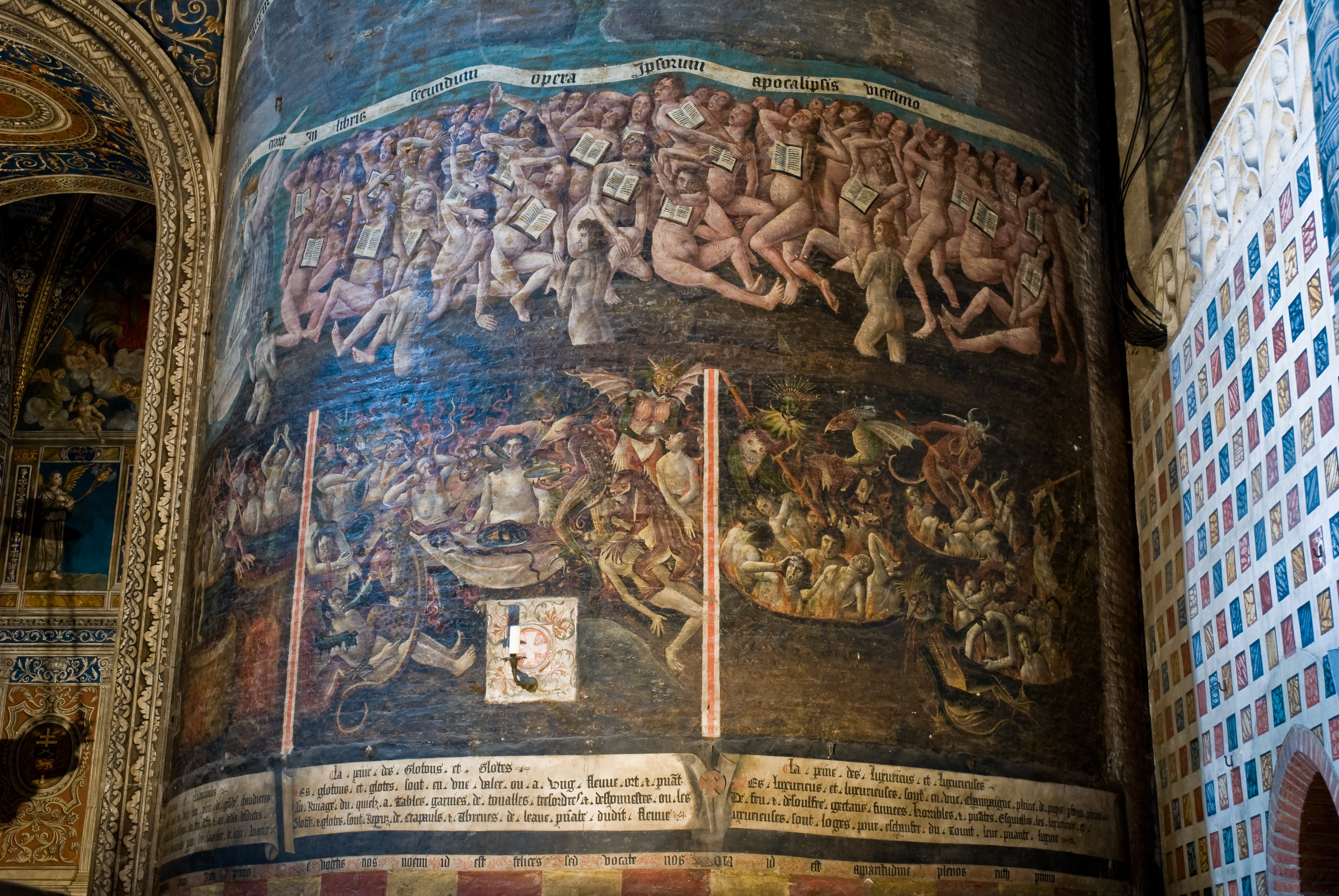
The torments of those condemned – right pillar

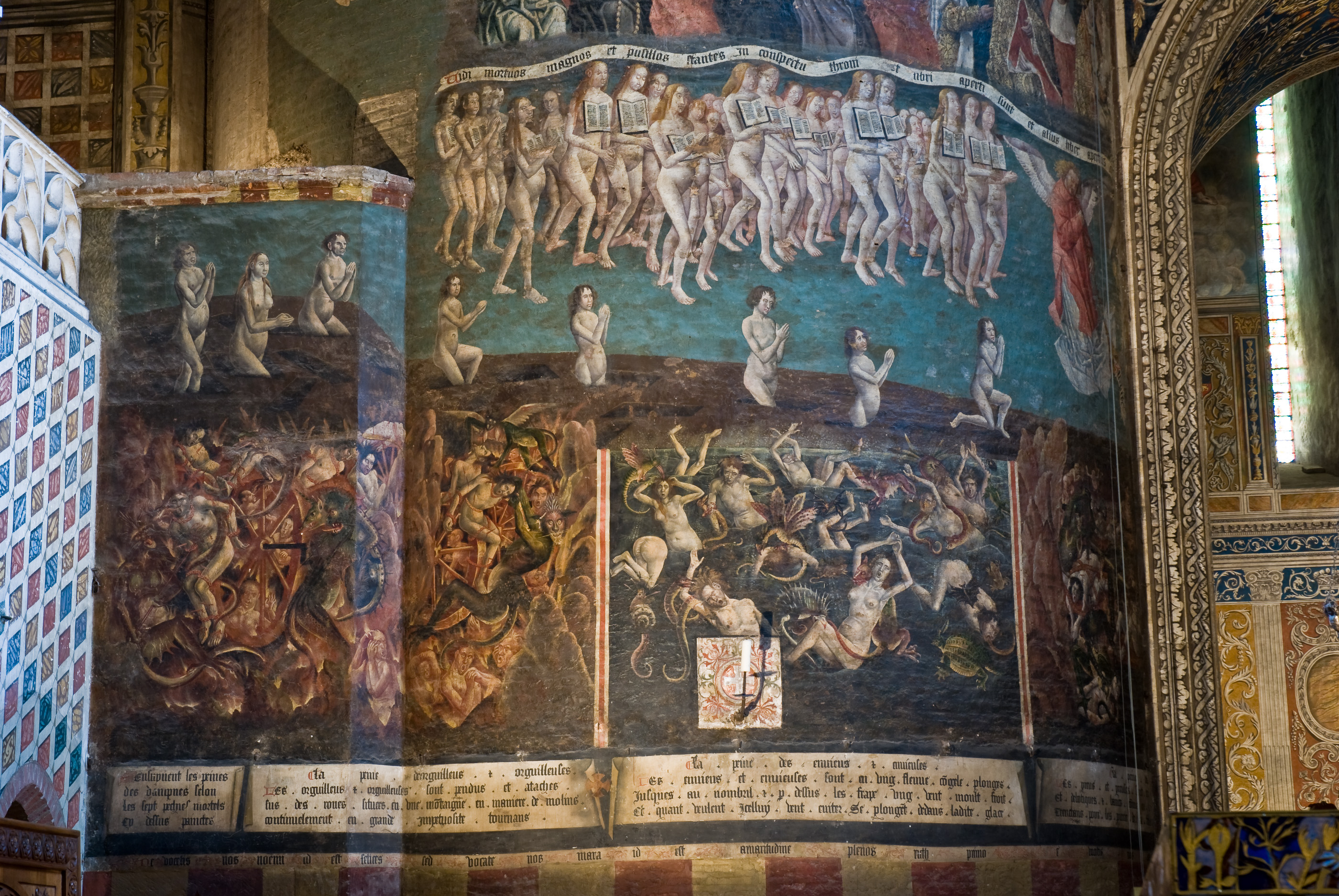
Torments of those condemned – left pillar

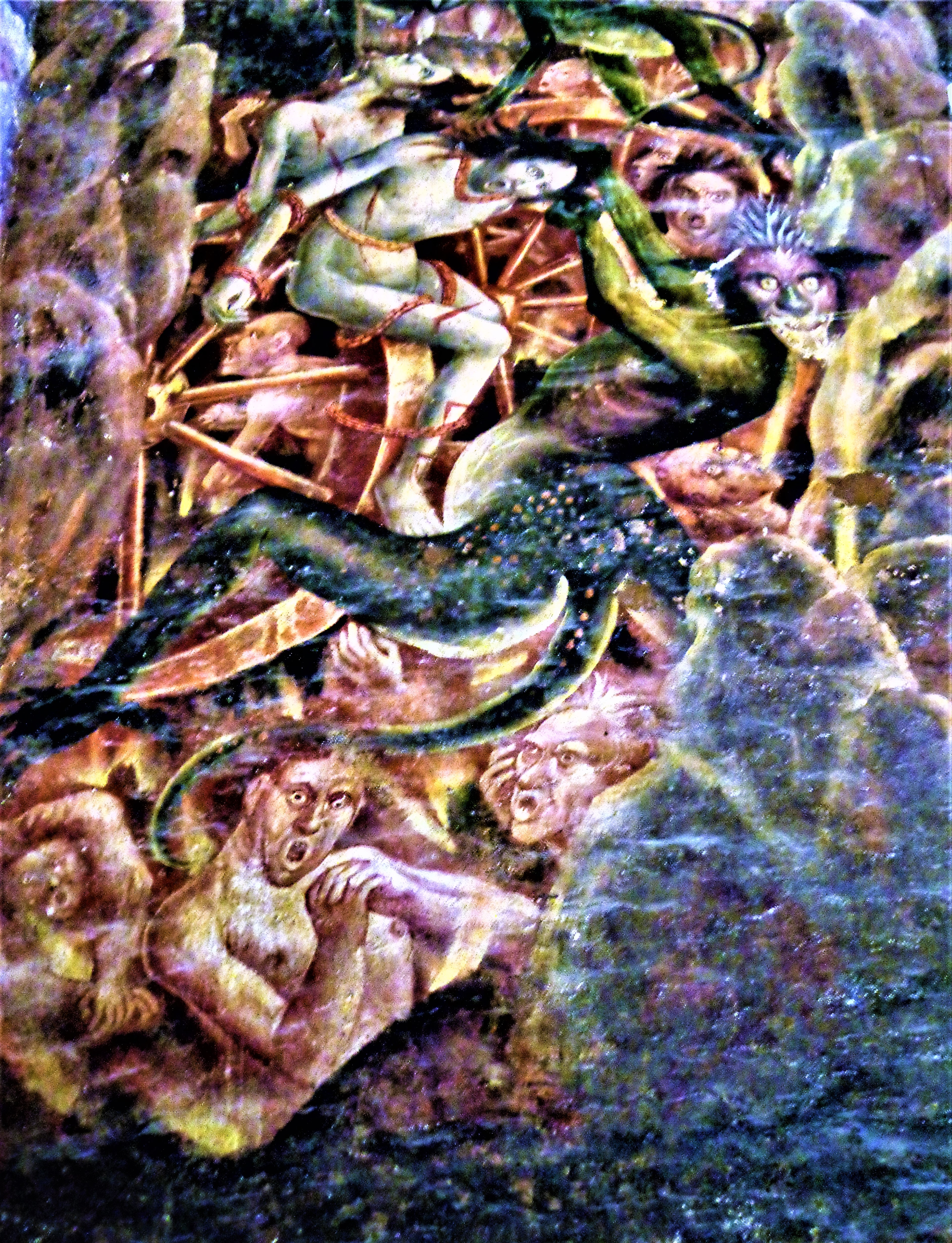
Detail of the Last Judgement

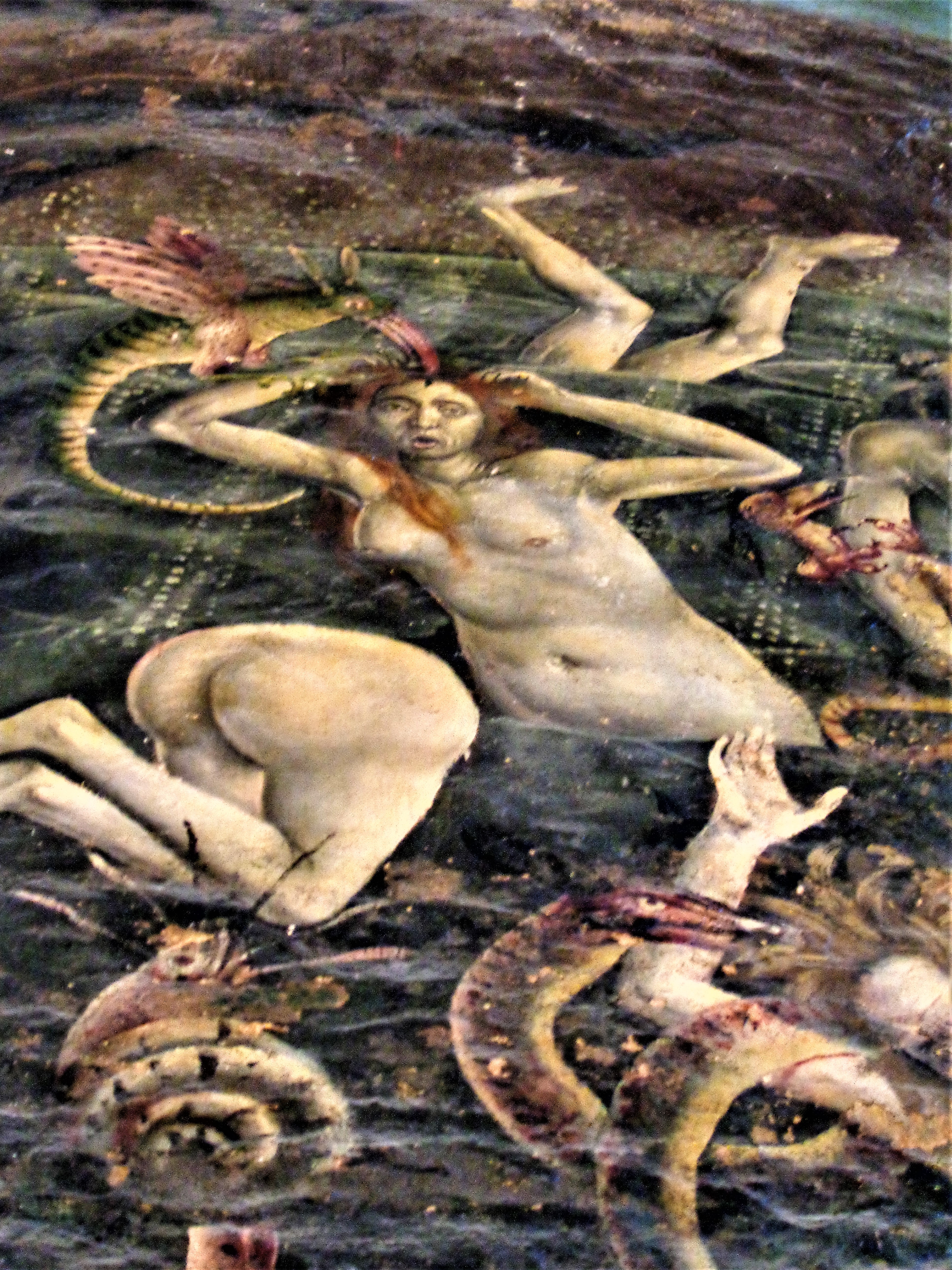
Detail of the Last Judgement

The oldest painting is the mural of the Last Judgement, on the interior of the western front, which was painted at the end of the 15th century. It covers an area of 15 by 18 metres (49 by 59 ft). Some portions of the mural were removed in 1693 due to the creation the Chapel of Saint Clair at the base of the tower. Some of the central figures, such as Christ rendering judgement and Archangel Michael weighing the sins of those being judged, were removed to make a doorway into a chapel.

The top portion of the painting depicts a row of angels; below them is a rank of apostles, dressed in white to symbolise their purity. Below them are ranks of saints and clerics, including a pope and monks of the different orders. as well as an emperor (probably Charlemagne) and Saint Louis. At the bottom are the sinners being judged, mostly nude, with a band of text reminding viewers that the judgement was irreversible.

=== Stained glass ===
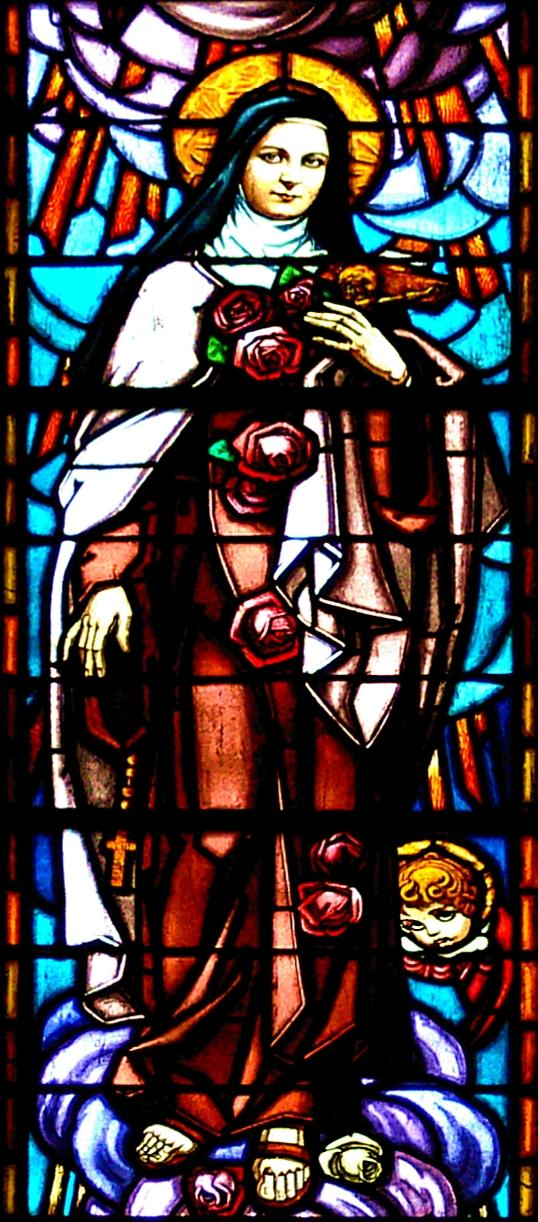
Saint Theresa of Lisieux

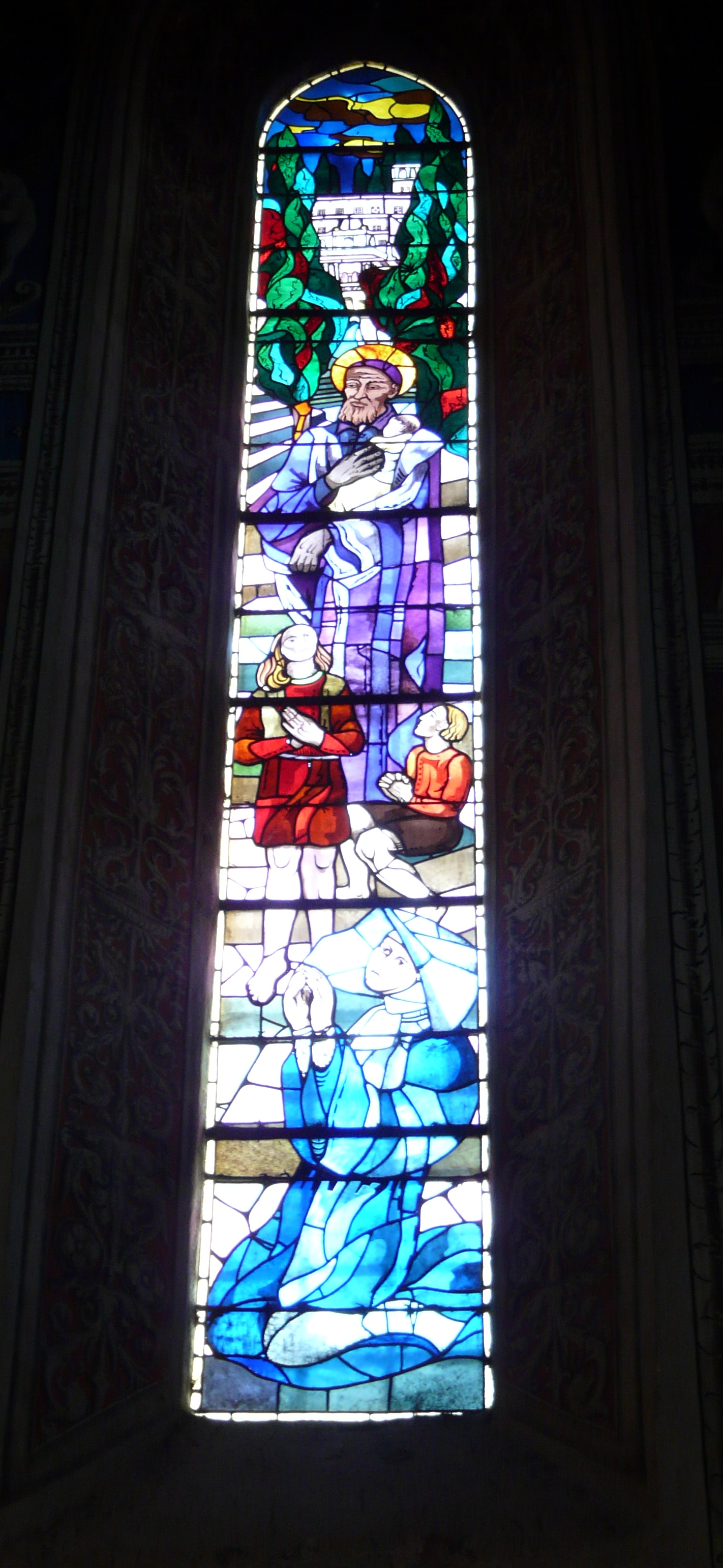
Window of Albi Cathedral

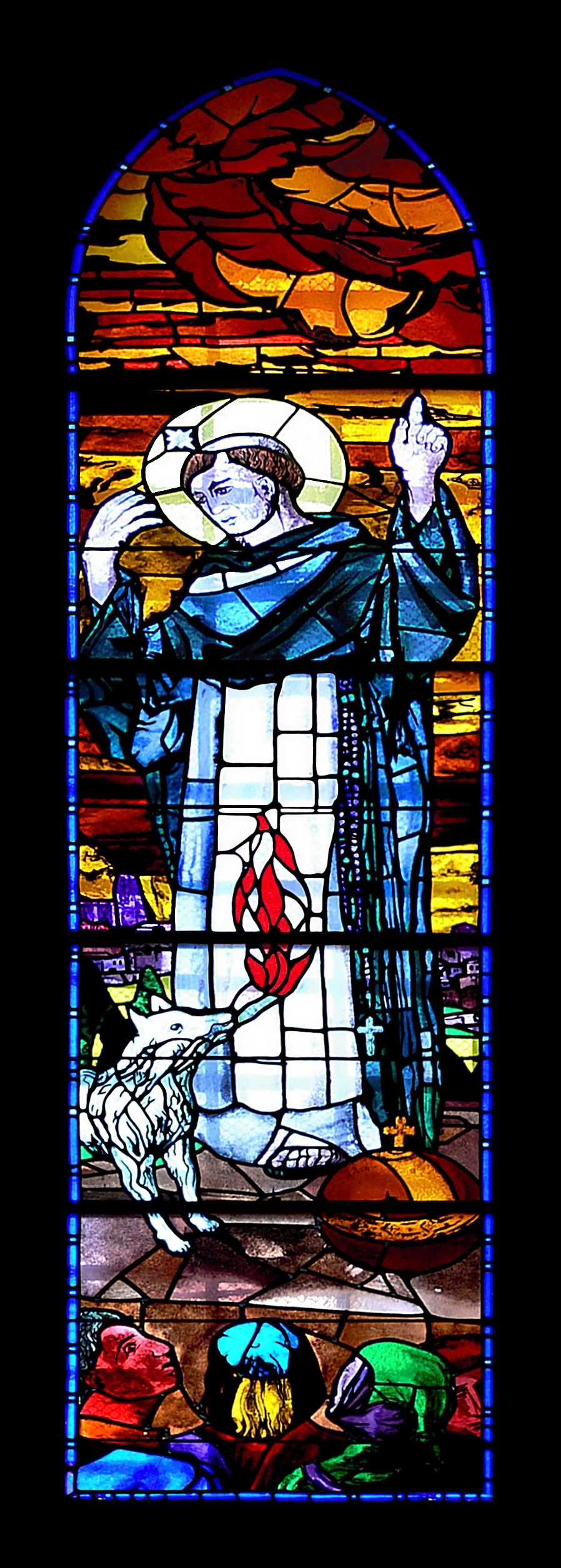
St. Dominic

Only a small amount of medieval stained glass remains in the widows of the cathedral; most of the windows date to the 19th and first part of the 20th century. The Chapel of the Holy Cross has two windows from the 15th century, representing Saint Helen carrying a large cross, and King Louis IX holding a cross-reliquary. Some pieces of earlier glass, including the coat of arms of Bishop Beraud de Fargues, dated between 1320 and 1330, are incorporated into more modern windows.

=== The organ ===
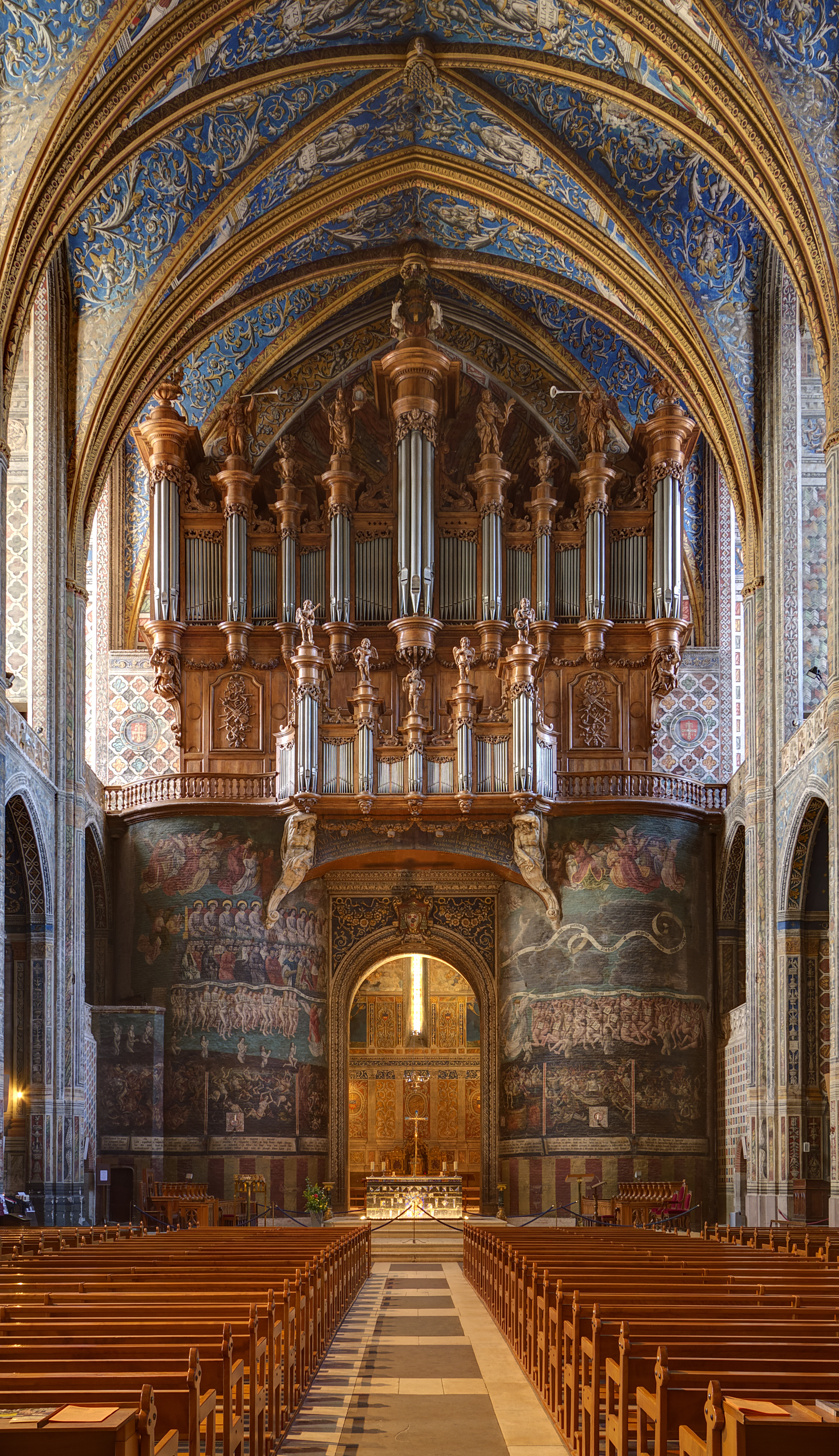
The organ and "The Last Judgement" fresco

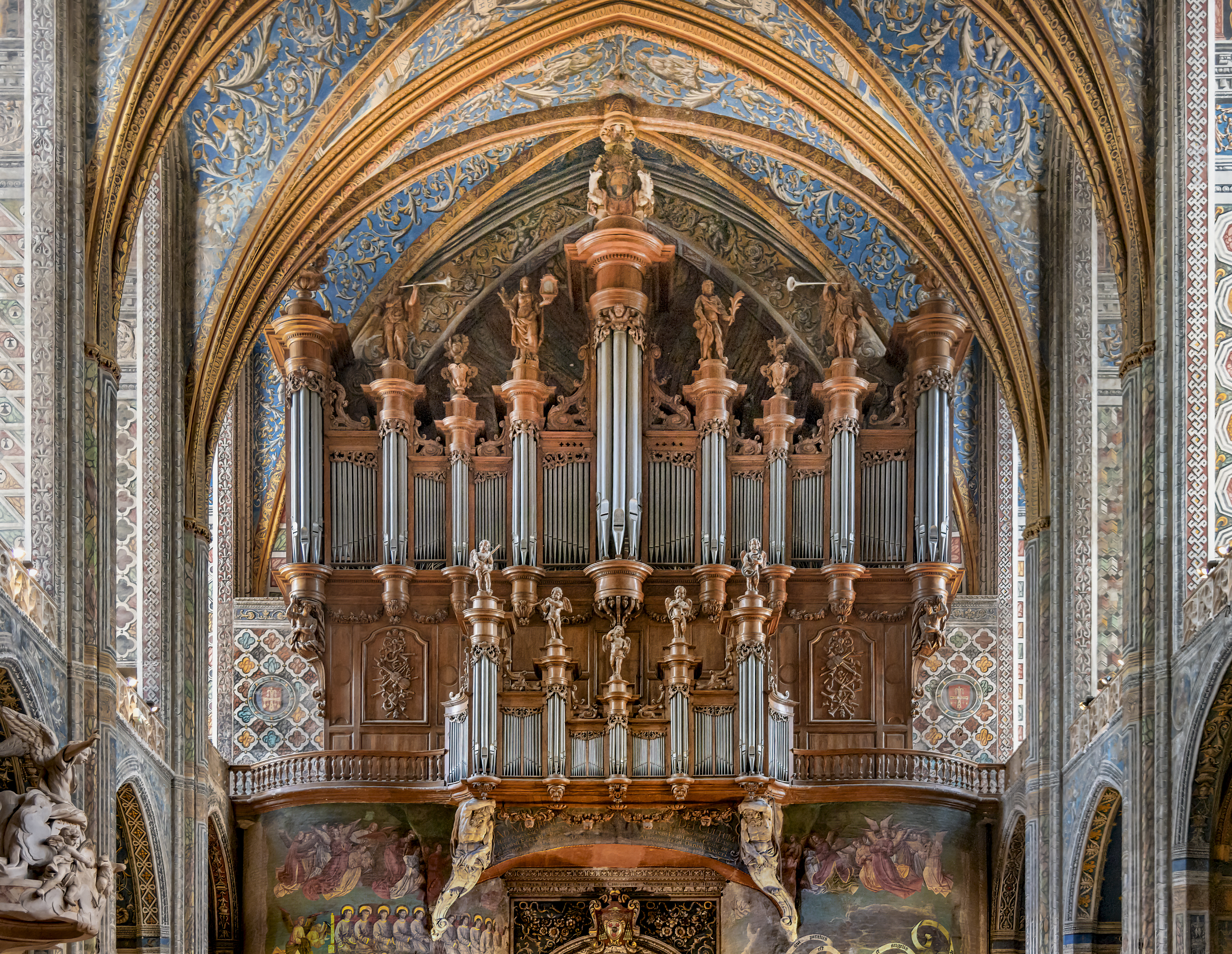
The organ

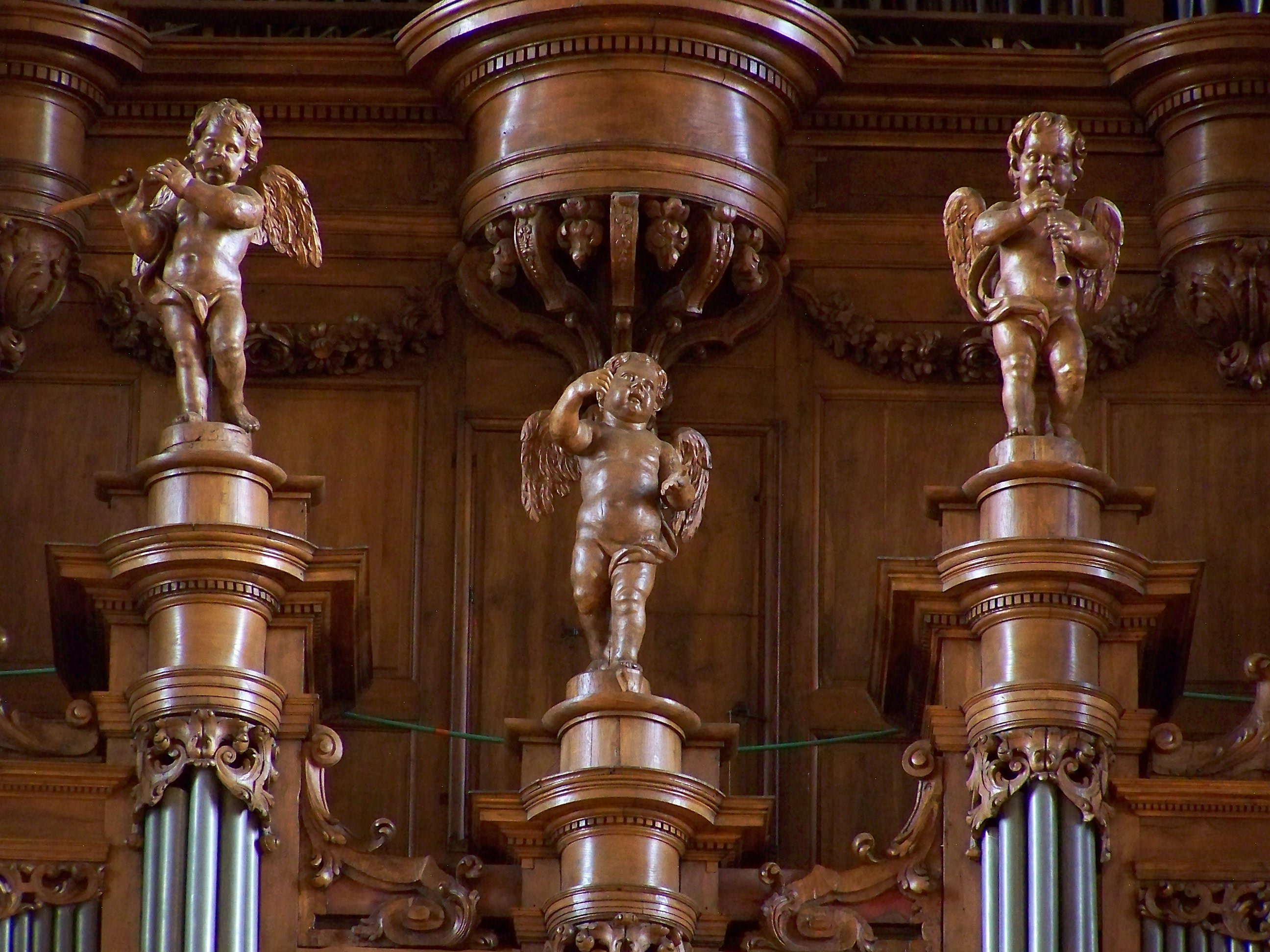
Detail of the angel-musicians

The main organ of the cathedral is located on the upper level the nave at the west end, above the mural of the Last Judgement. It was commissioned in 1734 by Bishop de la Croix de Castries from the craftsman Christophe Moucherel. It replaced the first organ, dating to the end of the 15th century, and a second smaller organ which had been attached to the rood screen. The 1734 organ reused some of the pipes of the first organ. The decoration atop the pipes of the organs includes, at the top, statues of angels with wings spread and with trumpets, heralding Saint Cecile and Saint Valerien. Below these are two white unicorns with the coats of arms of the Bishop, and below these five towers of pipes crowned with statues of angel-musicians. The cornice of the organ rests on the shoulders of two sculpted Atlantes.

The organ itself was rebuilt and restored several times in the 18th and 19th century; it was radically rebuilt in 1903 into a more romantic style, while preserving the older pipes above. Between 1977 and 1981 it was rebuilt again, restoring its original classical appearance.

== Treasury ==
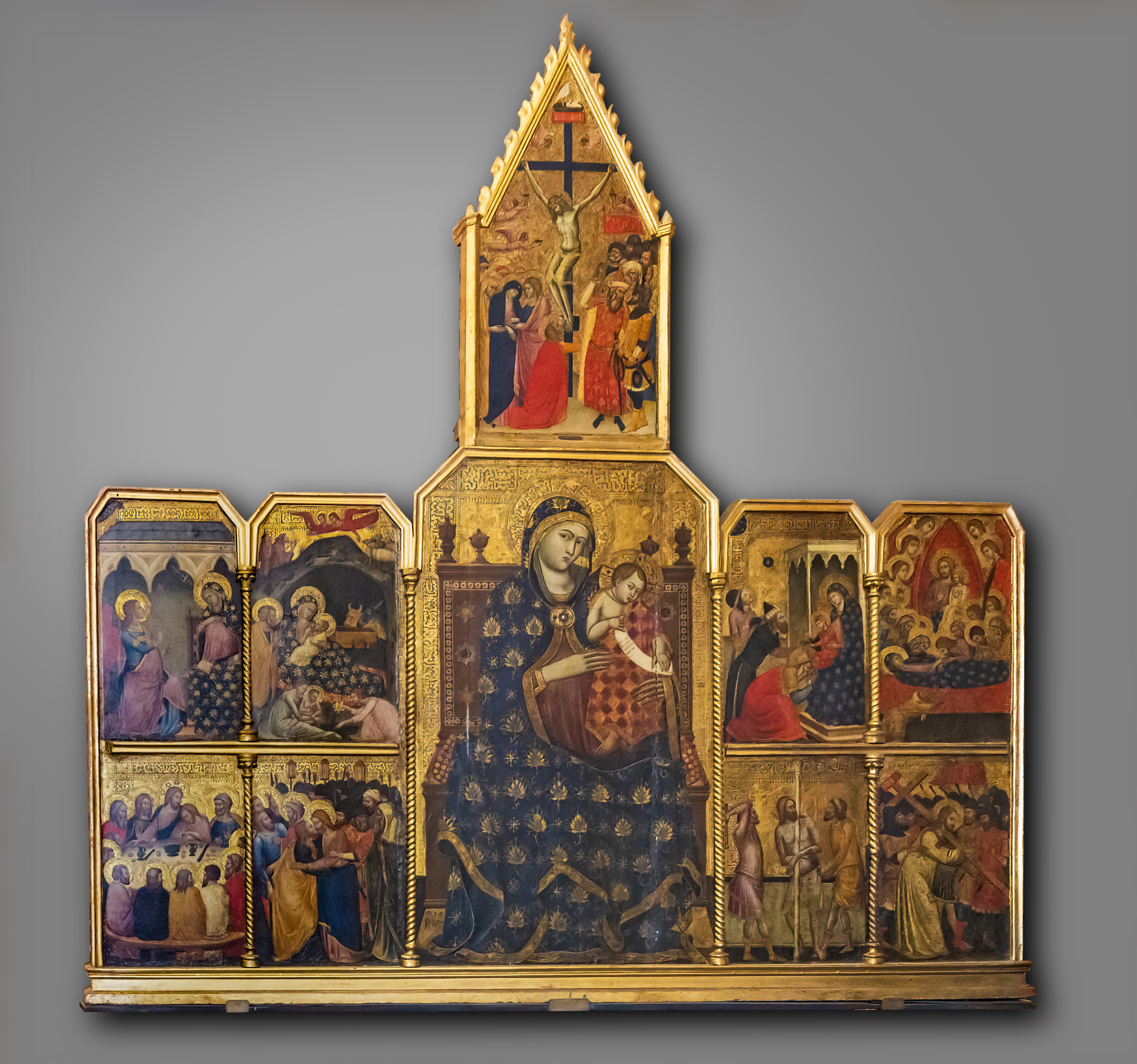
Polyptique of the life of the Virgin and Child from the 14th century

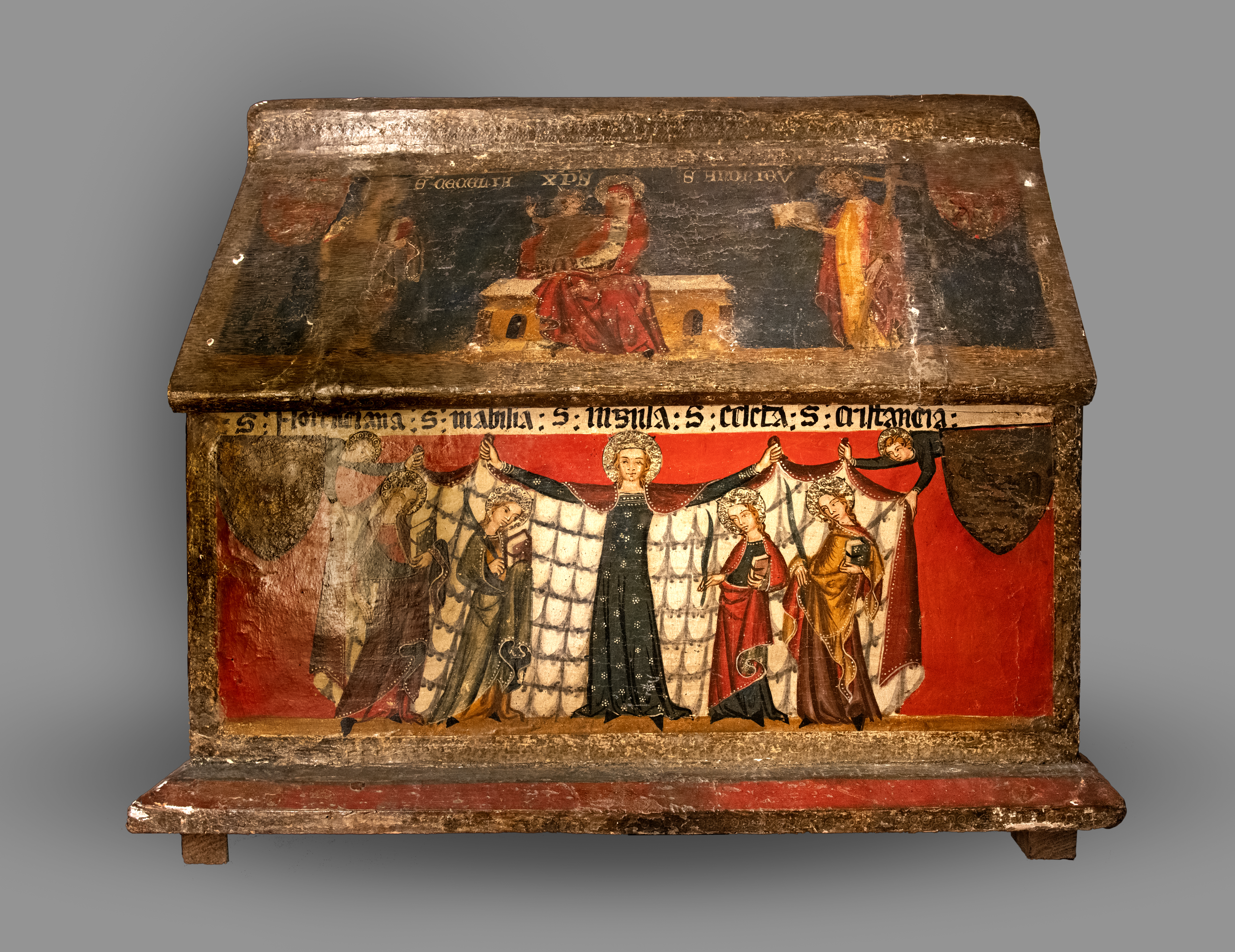
14th-century chest which contained relics of Saint Ursula (14th century)

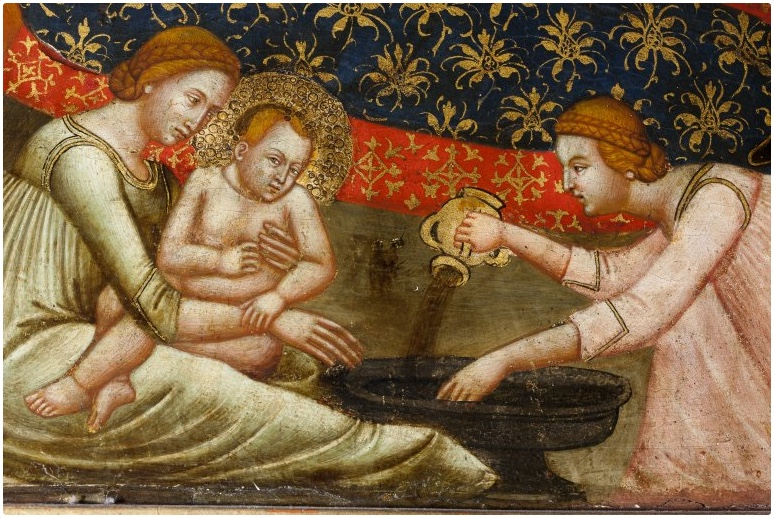
Bathing the infant Christ, tryptique of Saint Cecilia

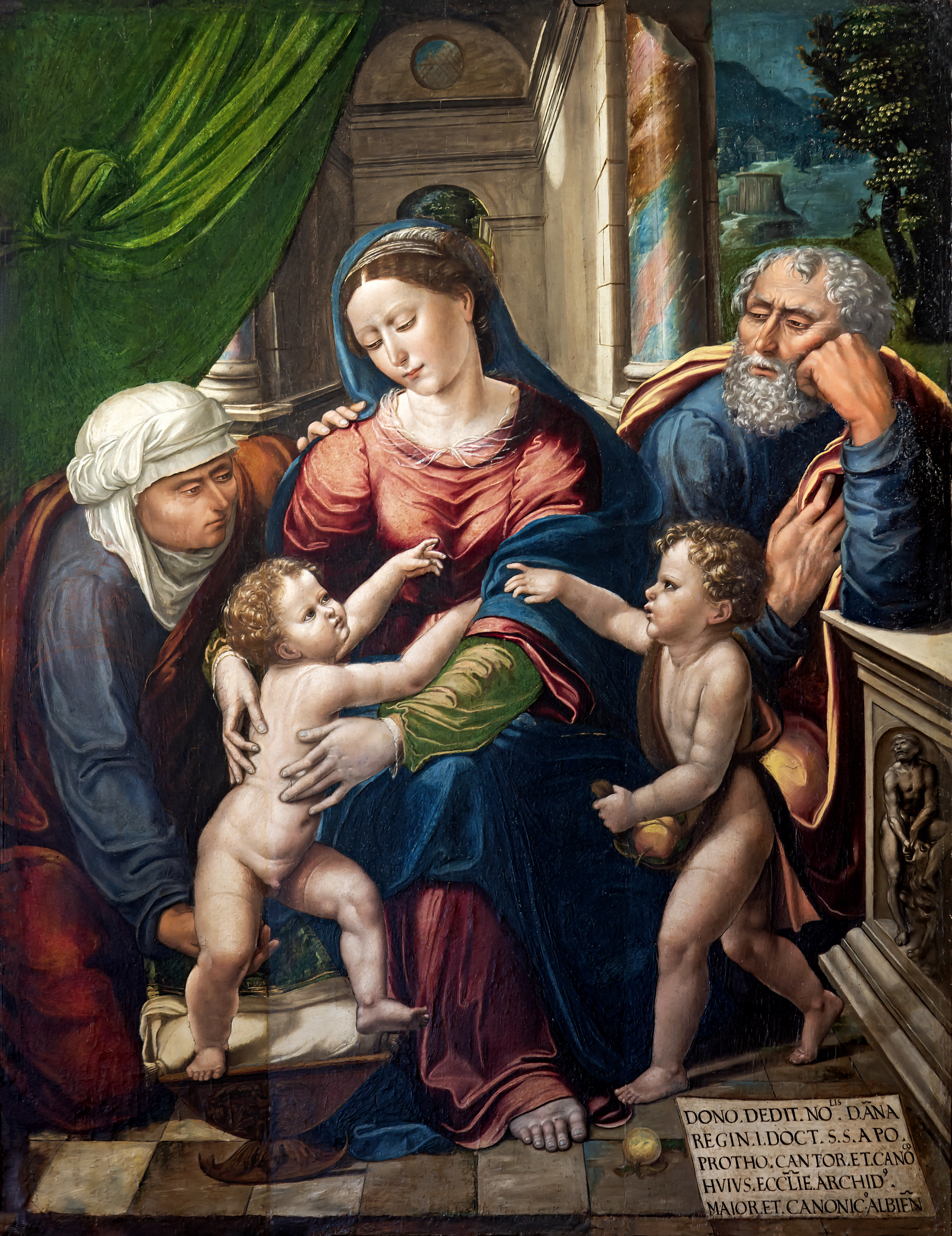
The Holy Family by Karsten van Limbos (16th century)

The treasury of the cathedral is a rare example of a cathedral treasury located in its original place. It is a vaulted chamber attached to the disambulatory of the nave on the north side of the cathedral, above the vestiere and adjoining the sacristy, which was constructed in the late 13th century, and was used to keep the church archives and precious objects. It has a series of niches, closed with iron grills. It was remade into a museum in 2001. It originally contained the cathedral's most precious relic, a fragment of the true cross, which disappeared in 1792 during the French Revolution, at the same time that the cathedral main altar and silver retable were destroyed. The objects displayed now are largely those that were preserved in the tombs of the bishops, as well as more recent objects made in the early 19th century. It also contains a collection of paintings, including a polyptyque of scenes from the life of Virgin and Child from the 16th century, with a gilded background, and paintings of the life of Saint Cecelia, the patron saint of the cathedral.

== The Bishops's Palace – Toulouse-Lautrec Museum ==
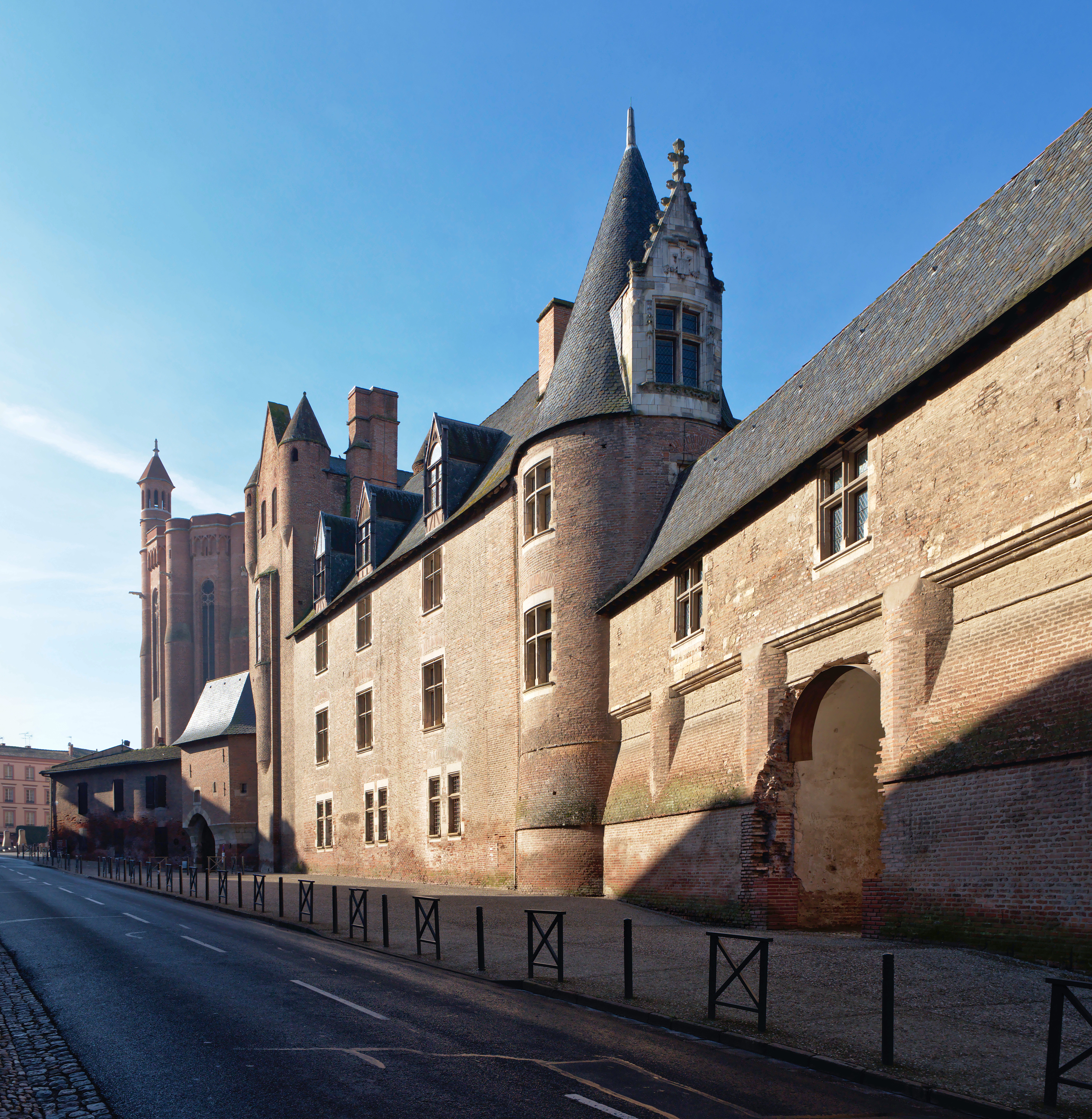
Exterior of the Palais de la Berbie

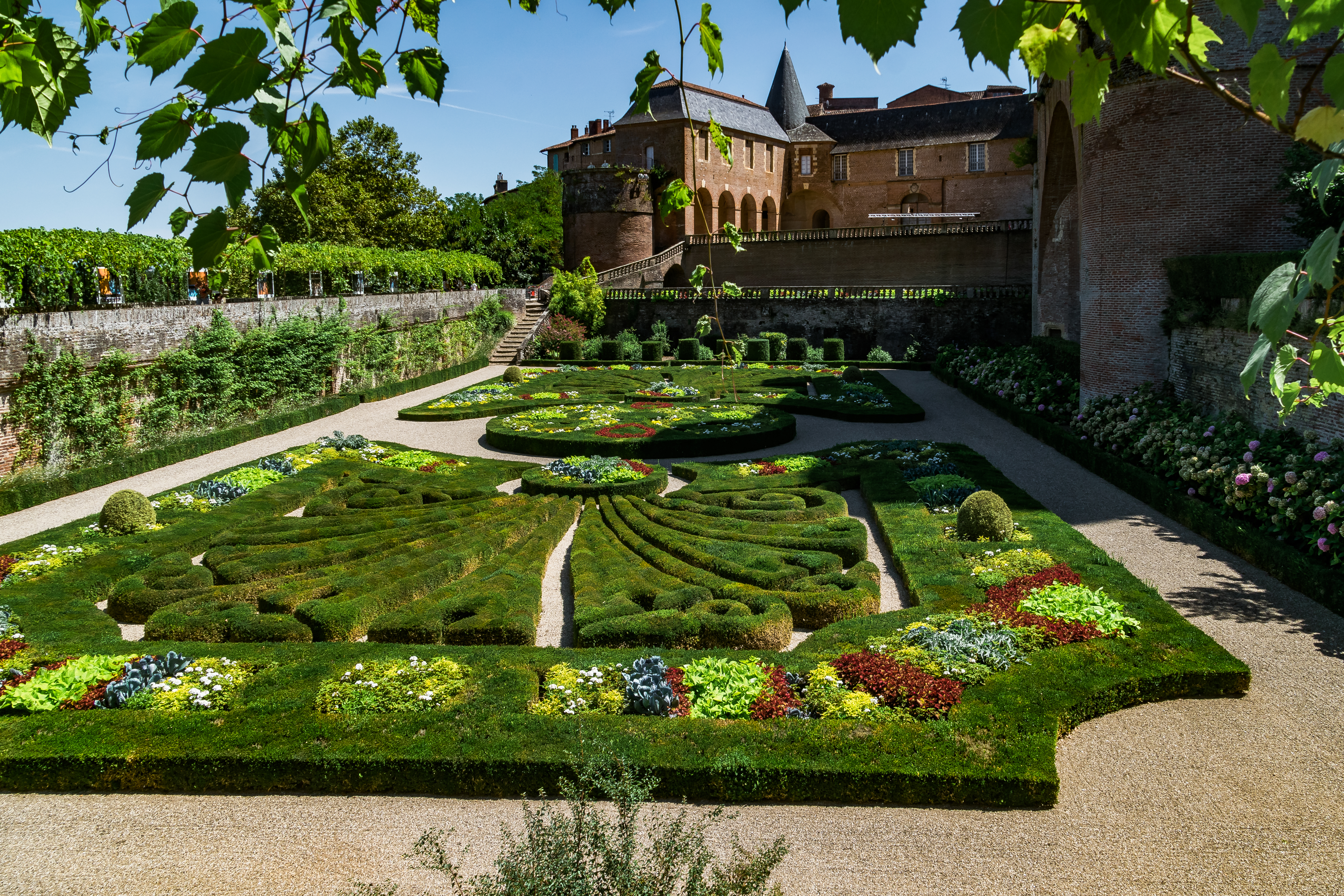
The garden of the Palais de la Berbie

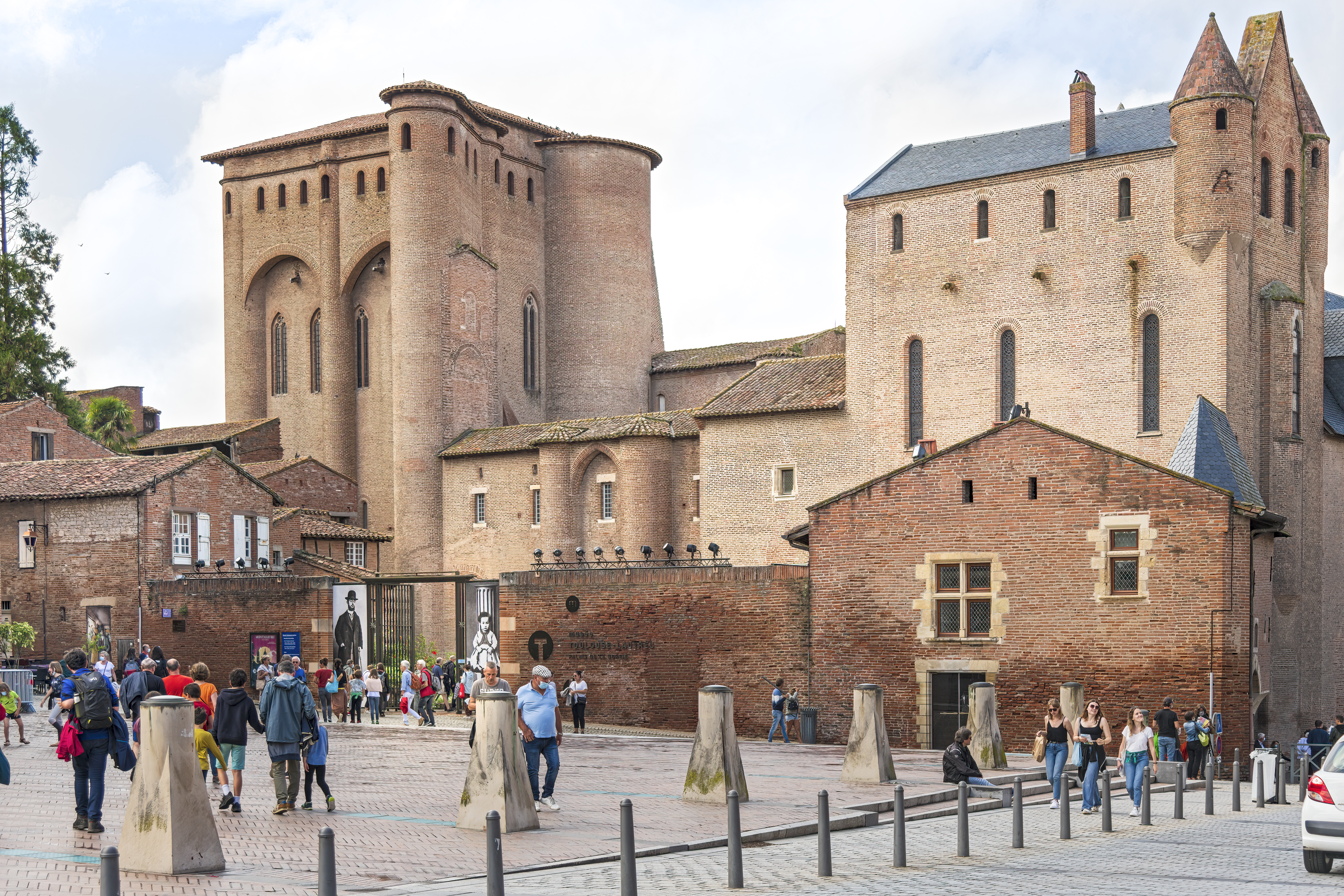
Entrance of Toulouse-Lautrec Museum

"Salon in the Rue des Moulins" by Toulouse-Lautrec (1894)

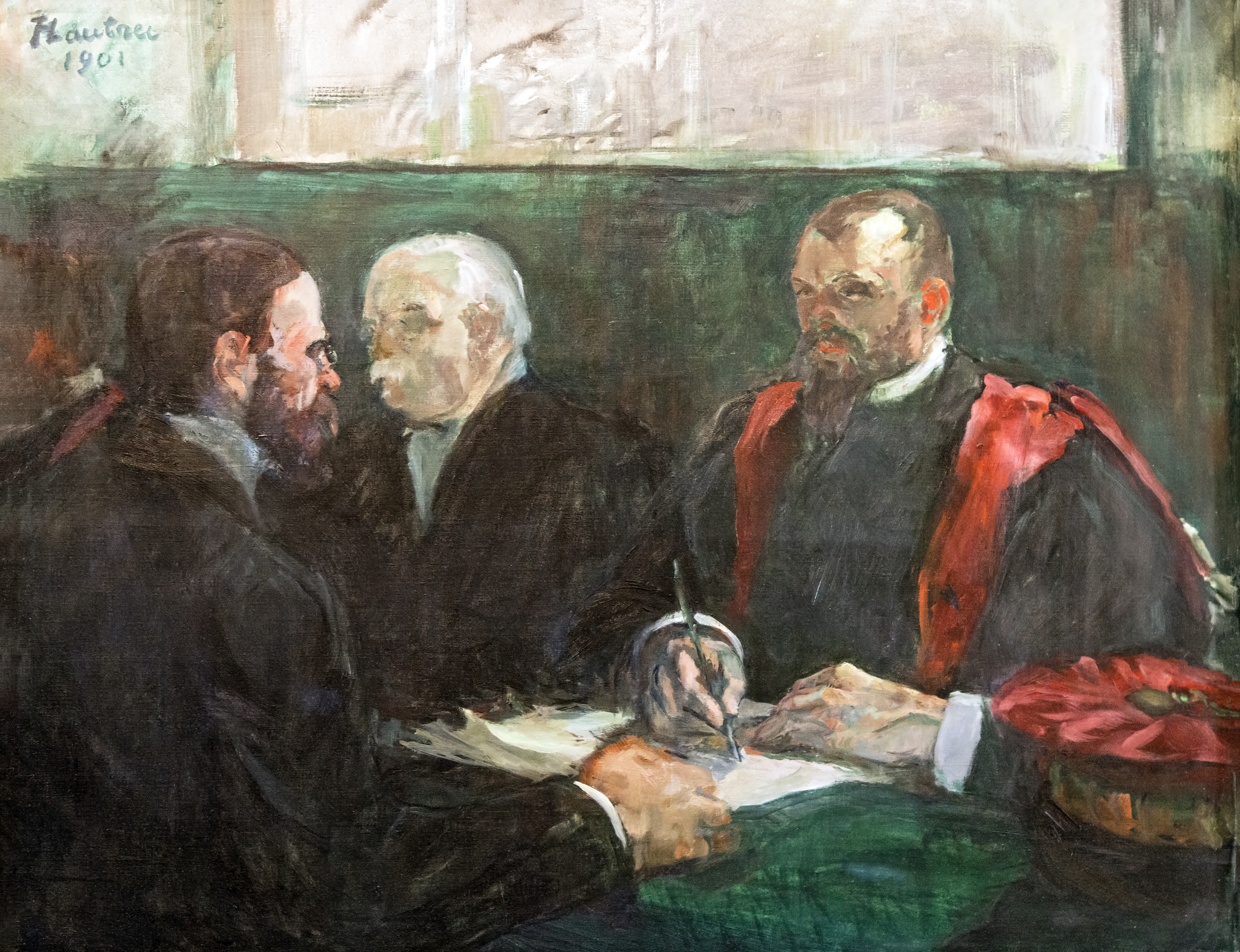
"Examination at the Faculty of Medicine" (1901), last painting by Toulouse-Lautrec

The Bishop's Palace, next to and below the cathedral, is formally known as the Palais épiscopal de la Berbie, and is included in the UNESCO historical site. Its name comes from "bisbia", a local variation of the Occitan word for bishop. It was begun before the cathedral itself, by Bishop Durand de Beaucaire (bishop from 1228 to 1254), and was built like a small fortress against the Cathars or other potential enemies. The next resident, Bishop de Combret, fortified it further by connecting the residence to the cathedral tower, twenty-five meters away, with a wall fortified with bastions, and the addition of a machicoulis over the entrance. Bishop De Castanet surrounded the complex with a new wall and built the Saint Catherine tower, which was connected by a wall to the Durand de Beaucaire tower of the cathedral.

The palace was never attacked, and later bishops softened its appearance by adding residential buildings and a chapel and a French-style garden as well decorating the interiors with mosaics and art. In 1905, the cathedral and its properties were officially nationalised, and the palace was given to the city of Albi for use as a museum. In 1922 it received an important collection of works by Henri Toulouse-Lautrec, donated by his mother. It is now known as the Toulouse-Lautrec Museum. The collection includes his last painting, "Examination at the School of Medicine", from 1901.

== See also ==
- Albi
- French Gothic architecture
- Gothic cathedrals and churches
- List of Gothic Cathedrals in Europe

== Bibliography ==
- Sire, Marie-Anne (2013). Cathédrale Saint-Cécile d'Albi (in French). Centre des monuments nationaux, Éditions du patrimoine. ISBN 978-2-7577-0263-5.
