= 2014–15 Serie A =

113th season of top-tier Italian football

Serie A
- Season: 2014–15
- Dates: 30 August 2014 – 31 May 2015
- Champions: Juventus; 31st title
- Relegated: Cesena; Cagliari; Parma (to LND)
- Champions League: Juventus; Roma; Lazio
- Europa League: Fiorentina; Napoli; Sampdoria
- Matches: 380
- Goals: 1,024 (2.69 per match)
- Top goalscorer: Mauro Icardi; Luca Toni (22 goals each)
- Best goalkeeper: Gianluigi Buffon (18 clean sheets)
- Biggest home win: Inter 7–0 Sassuolo (14 September 2014); Juventus 7–0 Parma (9 November 2014)
- Biggest away win: Palermo 0–4 Lazio (29 September 2014); Empoli 0–4 Cagliari (25 October 2014); Cagliari 0–4 Fiorentina (30 November 2014)
- Highest scoring: Parma 4–5 Milan (14 September 2014)
- Longest winning run: 8 games Lazio
- Longest unbeaten run: 20 games Juventus
- Longest winless run: 18 games Cesena
- Longest losing run: 6 games Parma
- Highest attendance: 79,173; Milan 1–1 Internazionale (23 November 2014)
- Lowest attendance: 5,000; Chievo 2–1 Cesena (9 November 2014)
- Average attendance: 22,149

The 2014–15 Serie A (known as the Serie A TIM for sponsorship reasons) was the 113th season of top-tier Italian football, the 83rd in a round-robin tournament, and the fifth since its organization under a league committee separate from Serie B. It began on 30 August 2014.

A total of 20 teams competed in the league: 17 sides from the 2013–14 season and three promoted from the 2013–14 Serie B campaign. Juventus were the defending champions, successfully defending their title for the fourth consecutive time. On 2 May 2015, Juventus won the Scudetto for the fourth consecutive time.

== Events ==
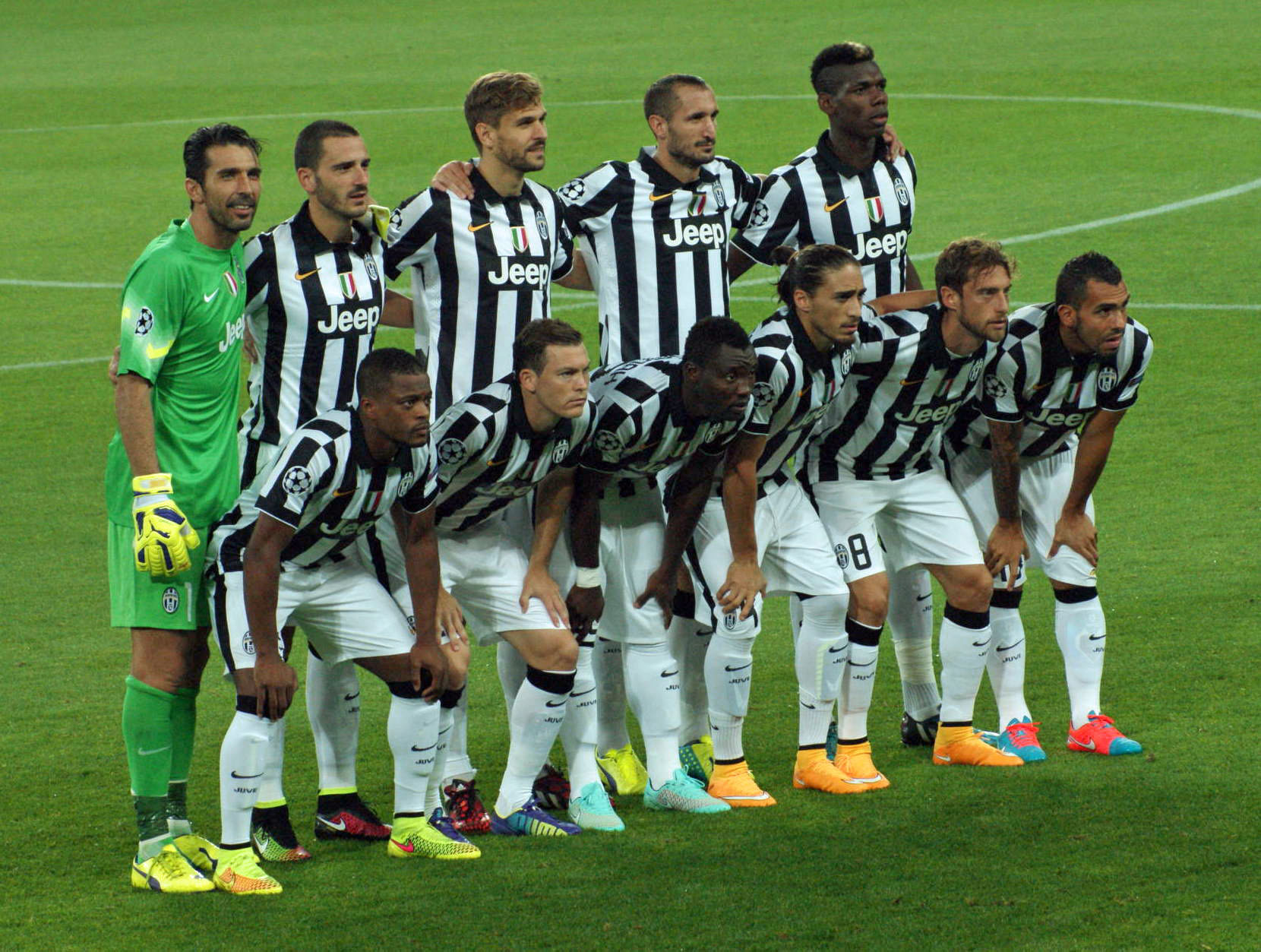
2014–15 Juventus team

The season featured the return of Palermo after only one season in the second division and Empoli, whose last appearance was in the 2007–08 season. Cesena, the play-off winner, returned to the top level after two years in Serie B.

The pre-season saw two ownership changes: Cagliari was sold from Massimo Cellino to Milanese entrepreneur Tommaso Giulini, a former board member at Internazionale. Sampdoria was sold by Edoardo Garrone (son of the late Riccardo Garrone) to Rome-based film businessman Massimo Ferrero.

The season was also influenced by serious financial problems surrounding Parma, involving two controversial takeovers during the season, its last chairman Giampietro Manenti being arrested on 18 March 2015 under accusation of money laundering, and the club being ultimately declared insolvent by the local court on the very next day.

The Serie A this season had the most goals on average than any of the five other top leagues in Europe.

== Teams ==
=== Stadiums and locations ===
Locations of the 2014–15 Serie A teams

Team	Home city	Stadium	Capacity	2013–14 season
Atalanta	Bergamo	Stadio Atleti Azzurri d'Italia	26,542	11th in Serie A
Cagliari	Cagliari	Stadio Sant'Elia	16,000	15th in Serie A
Cesena	Cesena	Stadio Dino Manuzzi	23,900	Serie B playoffs winner
Chievo Verona	Verona	Stadio Marc'Antonio Bentegodi	38,402	16th in Serie A
Empoli	Empoli	Stadio Carlo Castellani	16,800	2nd in Serie B
Fiorentina	Florence	Stadio Artemio Franchi	47,282	4th in Serie A
Genoa	Genoa	Stadio Luigi Ferraris	36,685	13th in Serie A
Hellas Verona	Verona	Stadio Marc'Antonio Bentegodi	38,402	10th in Serie A
Internazionale	Milan	San Siro	80,018	5th in Serie A
Juventus	Turin	Juventus Stadium	41,254	Serie A champions
Lazio	Rome	Stadio Olimpico	72,698	9th in Serie A
Milan	Milan	San Siro	80,018	8th in Serie A
Napoli	Naples	Stadio San Paolo	60,240	3rd in Serie A
Palermo	Palermo	Stadio Renzo Barbera	36,349	Serie B Champions
Parma	Parma	Stadio Ennio Tardini	27,906	6th in Serie A
Roma	Rome	Stadio Olimpico	72,698	2nd in Serie A
Sampdoria	Genoa	Stadio Luigi Ferraris	36,685	12th in Serie A
Sassuolo	Sassuolo^{1}	Mapei Stadium	23,717	17th in Serie A
Torino	Turin	Olimpico di Torino	27,994	7th in Serie A
Udinese	Udine	Stadio Friuli	30,642	14th in Serie A

1. Sassuolo plays in Reggio Emilia.

=== Personnel and sponsorship ===
Team	President	Head coach	Captain	Kit manufacturer	Shirt sponsor(s)	
Team	President	Head coach	Captain	Kit manufacturer	Main	Other
Atalanta	(Italy) Antonio Percassi	(Italy) Edoardo Reja	(Italy) Gianpaolo Bellini	Nike	SuisseGas	Front: Konica Minolta; Back: Bergamopost/Oriocenter/Consorzio Fidi Confartigianato Bergamo - Confiab/Stone City/Caffè Toraldo/Italia Paghe/ONE Power&Gas
Cagliari	(Italy) Tommaso Giulini	(Italy) Gianluca Festa	(Italy) Daniele Conti	Kappa	Sardegna/Brigante/Sol.Bat/Pecorino Romano/ICIB/IN.ECO/iziPlay/Fluorsid/Termomeccanica Energia/subito.it/Vestis/portalesardegna.com/CRAI/Io tifo positivo/Alarm System	Front: Tiscali/Indoona; Back: Intesa Sanpaolo
Cesena	(Italy) Giorgio Lugaresi	(Italy) Domenico Di Carlo	(Italy) Davide Succi	Lotto	Prink	None
Chievo Verona	(Italy) Luca Campedelli	(Italy) Rolando Maran	(Italy) Sergio Pellissier	Givova	Paluani/Jetcoin	Front: Midac Batteries; Back: Nobis Assicurazioni
Empoli	(Italy) Fabrizio Corsi	(Italy) Maurizio Sarri	(Italy) Davide Moro	Royal	NGM Smartphones	Front: Computer Gross; Back: Banca Dinamica
Fiorentina	(Italy) Mario Cognigni	(Italy) Vincenzo Montella	(Italy) Manuel Pasqual	Joma	Save the Children/Volkswagen/Val di Fassa	Front: Save the Children; Back: Save the Children
Genoa	(Italy) Enrico Preziosi	(Italy) Gian Piero Gasperini	(Argentina) Nicolás Burdisso	Lotto	Fuori Sanremo RadioItalia/DF Sport Specialist	Front: McVitie's
Hellas Verona	(Italy) Maurizio Setti	(Italy) Andrea Mandorlini	(Italy) Luca Toni	Nike	Franklin & Marshall	Front: agsm/Leaderform; Back: Manila Grace
Internazionale	(Indonesia) Erick Thohir	(Italy) Roberto Mancini	(Italy) Andrea Ranocchia	Nike	Pirelli	None
Juventus	(Italy) Andrea Agnelli	(Italy) Massimiliano Allegri	(Italy) Gianluigi Buffon	Nike	Jeep/Expo 2015	None
Lazio	(Italy) Claudio Lotito	(Italy) Stefano Pioli	(Italy) Stefano Mauri	Macron	Clinica Paideia/Associazione italiana contro le leucemie-linfomi e mieloma	None
Milan	(Italy) Silvio Berlusconi	(Italy) Filippo Inzaghi	(Italy) Riccardo Montolivo	Adidas	Fly Emirates	None
Napoli	(Italy) Aurelio De Laurentiis	(Spain) Rafael Benítez	(Slovakia) Marek Hamšík	Macron	Lete	Front: Pasta Garofalo
Palermo	(Italy) Maurizio Zamparini	(Italy) Giuseppe Iachini	(Italy) Stefano Sorrentino	Joma	Rosanero Cares	Front: CBM Sport
Parma	(Italy) vacant after bankruptcy	(Italy) Roberto Donadoni	(Italy) Alessandro Lucarelli	Erreà	Folletto	Front: Energy T.I. Group/SanThè Sant'Anna; Back: Piazza Italia/Bava Srl/Risparmio Casa/INC Hotels/Corona Carta/Birra Parma/NordestWash/Dac a trá/Hotel Due Mari Sestri Levante/Ranieri/Caesars Palace Luxury/CRAI Tirreno/Un Posto al Sole Ristorante/Twin's Cafè/Edil P.3
Roma	(United States) James Pallotta	(France) Rudi Garcia	(Italy) Francesco Totti	Nike	Telethon	None
Sampdoria	(Italy) Massimo Ferrero	(Serbia) Siniša Mihajlović	(Italy) Angelo Palombo	Kappa	Sin City: A Dame to Kill For/Parà Tempotest	None
Sassuolo	(Italy) Carlo Rossi	(Italy) Eusebio Di Francesco	(Italy) Francesco Magnanelli	Sportika	Mapei	None
Torino	(Italy) Urbano Cairo	(Italy) Giampiero Ventura	(Poland) Kamil Glik	Kappa	Fratelli Beretta	Front: Suzuki/Suzuki Vitara; Back: Tecnoalarm
Udinese	(Italy) Franco Soldati	(Italy) Andrea Stramaccioni	(Italy) Antonio Di Natale	HS Football	Dacia	Front: Alcott/Upim

- Additionally, referee kits are now being made by Diadora, and Nike has a new match ball, the Ordem Serie A.

=== Managerial changes ===
Team	Outgoing manager	Manner of departure	Date of vacancy	Position in table	Replaced by	Date of appointment
Udinese	(Italy) Francesco Guidolin	Change of role	20 May 2014	Pre-season	(Italy) Andrea Stramaccioni	4 June 2014
Milan	(Netherlands) Clarence Seedorf	Sacked	9 June 2014	Pre-season	(Italy) Filippo Inzaghi	9 June 2014
Lazio	(Italy) Edoardo Reja	Resigned	12 June 2014	Pre-season	(Italy) Stefano Pioli	12 June 2014
Cagliari	(Italy) Ivo Pulga	Sacked	20 June 2014	Pre-season	(Czech Republic) Zdeněk Zeman	20 June 2014
Juventus	(Italy) Antonio Conte	Resigned	15 July 2014	Pre-season	(Italy) Massimiliano Allegri	16 July 2014
Chievo	(Italy) Eugenio Corini	Sacked	19 October 2014	17th	(Italy) Rolando Maran	19 October 2014
Internazionale	(Italy) Walter Mazzarri	Sacked	14 November 2014	9th	(Italy) Roberto Mancini	14 November 2014
Cesena	(Italy) Pierpaolo Bisoli	Sacked	8 December 2014	19th	(Italy) Domenico Di Carlo	8 December 2014
Cagliari	(Czech Republic) Zdeněk Zeman	Sacked	23 December 2014	18th	(Italy) Gianfranco Zola	24 December 2014
Atalanta	(Italy) Stefano Colantuono	Sacked	4 March 2015	17th	(Italy) Edoardo Reja	4 March 2015
Cagliari	(Italy) Gianfranco Zola	Sacked	9 March 2015	18th	(Czech Republic) Zdeněk Zeman	9 March 2015
Cagliari	(Czech Republic) Zdeněk Zeman	Resigned	21 April 2015	19th	(Italy) Gianluca Festa	22 April 2015

=== Ownership changes ===
Team	Previous owner	New owner	Date
Cagliari	(Italy) Massimo Cellino	(Italy) Tommaso Giulini	11 June 2014
Sampdoria	(Italy) Edoardo Garrone	(Italy) Massimo Ferrero	12 June 2014
Parma	(Italy) Tommaso Ghirardi	(Cyprus) (Russia) Dastraso Holding Ltd.	20 December 2014
Parma	(Cyprus) (Russia) Dastraso Holding Ltd.	(Italy) Giampietro Manenti	9 February 2015
Parma	(Italy) Giampietro Manenti	Under provisional accounting	19 March 2015

== League table ==
Pos	Team	Pld	W	D	L	GF	GA	GD	Pts	Qualification or relegation
1	Juventus (C)	38	26	9	3	72	24	+48	87	Qualification for the Champions League group stage
2	Roma	38	19	13	6	54	31	+23	70	Qualification for the Champions League group stage
3	Lazio	38	21	6	11	71	38	+33	69	Qualification for the Champions League play-off round
4	Fiorentina	38	18	10	10	61	46	+15	64	Qualification for the Europa League group stage (Note: Since the winners of the 2014–15 Coppa Italia (Juventus) qualified for European competition based on league position, the spot awarded to the cup winners (Europa League group stage) was passed to the fifth-placed team and the spot originally meant for the fifth-placed team (Europa League third qualifying round) was given to the highest placed team that has obtained an UEFA licence and not already qualified for European competition.)
5	Napoli	38	18	9	11	70	54	+16	63	Qualification for the Europa League group stage
6	Genoa (Note: Genoa failed to obtain a UEFA licence from Italian Football Federation. Therefore, they were barred to participate in European competitions. Genoa appealed the decision, but the appeal was denied.)	38	16	11	11	62	47	+15	59	
7	Sampdoria	38	13	17	8	48	42	+6	56	Qualification for the Europa League third qualifying round
8	Internazionale	38	14	13	11	59	48	+11	55	
9	Torino	38	14	12	12	48	45	+3	54	
10	Milan	38	13	13	12	56	50	+6	52	
11	Palermo	38	12	13	13	53	55	−2	49 (Note: Palermo finished ahead of Sassuolo on head-to-head away goals scored: Palermo 2-1 Sassuolo, Sassuolo 0-0 Palermo.)	
12	Sassuolo	38	12	13	13	49	57	−8	49	
13	Hellas Verona	38	11	13	14	49	65	−16	46	
14	Chievo	38	10	13	15	28	41	−13	43	
15	Empoli	38	8	18	12	46	52	−6	42	
16	Udinese	38	10	11	17	43	56	−13	41	
17	Atalanta	38	7	16	15	38	57	−19	37	
18	Cagliari (R)	38	8	10	20	48	68	−20	34	Relegation to Serie B
19	Cesena (R)	38	4	12	22	36	73	−37	24	Relegation to Serie B
20	Parma (L, R)	38	6	8	24	33	75	−42	19 (Note: Parma was docked 7 points for failing to pay over players' wages. Later the club announced bankruptcy, and it was recreated without professional status.)	Relegation to Serie D

Source: 2014–15 Serie A, 2014-15 Serie A classification.
Rules for classification: 1) points; 2) head-to-head points; 3) head-to-head goal difference; 4) goal difference; 5) number of goals scored; 6) draw. (Head-to-head record is applied for clubs with the same number of points only once all matches between said clubs have been played.).
(C) Champions; (L) Liquidated after the season due to bankruptcy.; (R) Relegated

== Results ==
Home \ Away	ATA	CAG	CES	CHV	EMP	FIO	GEN	HEL	INT	JUV	LAZ	MIL	NAP	PAL	PAR	ROM	SAM	SAS	TOR	UDI
Atalanta		2–1	3–2	1–1	2–2	0–1	1–4	0–0	1–4	0–3	1–1	1–3	1–1	3–3	1–0	1–2	1–2	2–1	1–2	0–0
Cagliari	1–2		2–1	0–2	1–1	0–4	1–1	1–2	1–2	1–3	1–3	1–1	0–3	0–1	4–0	1–2	2–2	2–1	1–2	4–3
Cesena	2–2	0–1		0–1	2–2	1–4	0–3	1–1	0–1	2–2	2–1	1–1	1–4	0–0	1–0	0–1	1–1	2–3	2–3	1–0
Chievo	1–1	1–0	2–1		1–1	1–2	1–2	2–2	0–2	0–1	0–0	0–0	1–2	1–0	2–3	0–0	2–1	0–0	0–0	1–1
Empoli	0–0	0–4	2–0	3–0		2–3	1–1	0–0	0–0	0–2	2–1	2–2	4–2	3–0	2–2	0–1	1–1	3–1	0–0	1–2
Fiorentina	3–2	1–3	3–1	3–0	1–1		0–0	0–1	3–0	0–0	0–2	2–1	0–1	4–3	3–0	1–1	2–0	0–0	1–1	3–0
Genoa	2–2	2–0	3–1	0–2	1–1	1–1		5–2	3–2	1–0	1–0	1–0	1–2	1–1	2–0	0–1	0–1	3–3	5–1	1–1
Hellas Verona	1–0	1–0	3–3	0–1	2–1	1–2	2–2		0–3	2–2	1–1	1–3	2–0	2–1	3–1	1–1	1–3	3–2	1–3	0–1
Internazionale	2–0	1–4	1–1	0–0	4–3	0–1	3–1	2–2		1–2	2–2	0–0	2–2	3–0	1–1	2–1	1–0	7–0	0–1	1–2
Juventus	2–1	1–1	3–0	2–0	2–0	3–2	1–0	4–0	1–1		2–0	3–1	3–1	2–0	7–0	3–2	1–1	1–0	2–1	2–0
Lazio	3–0	4–2	3–0	1–1	4–0	4–0	0–1	2–0	1–2	0–3		3–1	0–1	2–1	4–0	1–2	3–0	3–2	2–1	0–1
Milan	0–1	3–1	2–0	2–0	1–1	1–1	1–3	2–2	1–1	0–1	3–1		2–0	0–2	3–1	2–1	1–1	1–2	3–0	2–0
Napoli	1–1	3–3	3–2	0–1	2–2	3–0	2–1	6–2	2–2	1–3	2–4	3–0		3–3	2–0	2–0	4–2	2–0	2–1	3–1
Palermo	2–3	5–0	2–1	1–0	0–0	2–3	2–1	2–1	1–1	0–1	0–4	1–2	3–1		2–1	1–1	1–1	2–1	2–2	1–1
Parma	0–0	0–0	1–2	0–1	0–2	1–0	1–2	2–2	2–0	1–0	1–2	4–5	2–2	1–0		1–2	0–2	1–3	0–2	1–0
Roma	1–1	2–0	2–0	3–0	1–1	2–0	2–0	2–0	4–2	1–1	2–2	0–0	1–0	1–2	0–0		0–2	2–2	3–0	2–1
Sampdoria	1–0	2–0	0–0	2–1	1–0	3–1	1–1	1–1	1–0	0–1	0–1	2–2	1–1	1–1	2–2	0–0		1–1	2–0	2–2
Sassuolo	0–0	1–1	1–1	1–0	3–1	1–3	3–1	2–1	3–1	1–1	0–3	3–2	0–1	0–0	4–1	0–3	0–0		1–1	1–1
Torino	0–0	1–1	5–0	2–0	0–1	1–1	2–1	0–1	0–0	2–1	0–2	1–1	1–0	2–2	1–0	1–1	5–1	0–1		1–0
Udinese	2–0	2–2	1–1	1–1	2–0	2–2	2–4	1–2	1–2	0–0	0–1	2–1	1–0	1–3	4–2	0–1	1–4	0–1	3–2	

Updated to match(es) played on 31 May 2015. Source: Serie A
Legend: Blue = home team win; Yellow = draw; Red = away team win.

== Season statistics ==
=== Top goalscorers ===
Rank	Player	Club	Goals
1	(Argentina) Mauro Icardi	Internazionale	22
1	(Italy) Luca Toni	Hellas Verona	22
3	(Argentina) Carlos Tevez	Juventus	20
4	(Argentina) Gonzalo Higuaín	Napoli	18
5	(France) Jérémy Ménez	Milan	16
6	(Italy) Domenico Berardi	Sassuolo	15
6	(Italy) Manolo Gabbiadini	Sampdoria/Napoli	15
8	(Italy) Antonio Di Natale	Udinese	14
9	(Argentina) Paulo Dybala	Palermo	13
9	(Spain) Iago Falque	Genoa	13
9	(Germany) Miroslav Klose	Lazio	13
9	(Italy) Fabio Quagliarella	Torino	13

=== Most clean sheets ===
Rank	Player	Club	Clean sheets
1	(Italy) Gianluigi Buffon	Juventus	18
2	(Italy) Morgan De Sanctis	Roma	16
3	(Argentina) Albano Bizzarri	Chievo	12
4	(Slovenia) Samir Handanović	Internazionale	11
5	(Italy) Federico Marchetti	Lazio	10
5	(Italy) Emiliano Viviano	Sampdoria	10
7	(Brazil) Neto	Fiorentina	9
7	(Italy) Luigi Sepe	Empoli	9
9	(Italy) Andrea Consigli	Sassuolo	8
9	(Italy) Antonio Mirante	Parma	8

=== Hat-tricks ===
Player	Club	Against	Result	Date
(Argentina) Mauro Icardi	Internazionale	Sassuolo	7–0	14 September 2014
(Sweden) Albin Ekdal	Cagliari	Internazionale	4–1	28 September 2014
(Serbia) Filip Đorđević	Lazio	Palermo	4–0	29 September 2014
(Argentina) Gonzalo Higuaín	Napoli	Hellas Verona	6–2	26 October 2014
(Italy) Fabio Quagliarella	Torino	Sampdoria	5–1	1 February 2015
(Italy) Domenico Berardi	Sassuolo	Milan	3–2	17 May 2015

== Awards ==
Individual Awards
Player of the Year (MVP)	(Argentina) Carlos Tevez (Juventus)
Coach of the Year	(Italy) Massimiliano Allegri (Juventus)
Club of the Year	Juventus
Referee of the Year	(Italy) Nicola Rizzoli

Serie A Team of the Year
Goalkeeper	(Italy) Gianluigi Buffon (Juventus)			
Defenders	(Italy) Matteo Darmian (Torino)	(Italy) Leonardo Bonucci (Juventus)	(Italy) Daniele Rugani (Empoli)	(Italy) Giorgio Chiellini (Juventus)
Midfielders	(Belgium) Radja Nainggolan (Roma)		(Italy) Andrea Pirlo (Juventus)	(France) Paul Pogba (Juventus)
Forwards	(Argentina) Mauro Icardi (Inter Milan)		(Italy) Luca Toni (Hellas Verona)	(Argentina) Carlos Tevez (Juventus)

== Attendances ==
#	Club	Avg. attendance	Highest
1	AS Roma	40,135	55,651
2	Juventus FC	38,553	40,485
3	Internazionale	37,270	74,022
4	AC Milan	36,661	79,173
5	SS Lazio	34,949	49,385
6	SSC Napoli	32,266	53,006
7	ACF Fiorentina	30,309	38,160
8	UC Sampdoria	21,745	30,585
9	Genoa CFC	20,045	29,800
10	Hellas Verona	19,299	27,155
11	US Città di Palermo	17,481	29,832
12	Torino FC	16,689	26,296
13	AC Cesena	16,260	23,661
14	Atalanta BC	15,160	22,074
15	US Sassuolo Calcio	12,831	21,584
16	Parma FC	11,904	15,311
17	Cagliari Calcio	10,793	16,074
18	ChievoVerona	10,652	25,000
19	Empoli FC	9,229	14,698
20	Udinese Calcio	8,912	11,241
