= Bernard Délicieux =

French Spiritual Franciscan friar

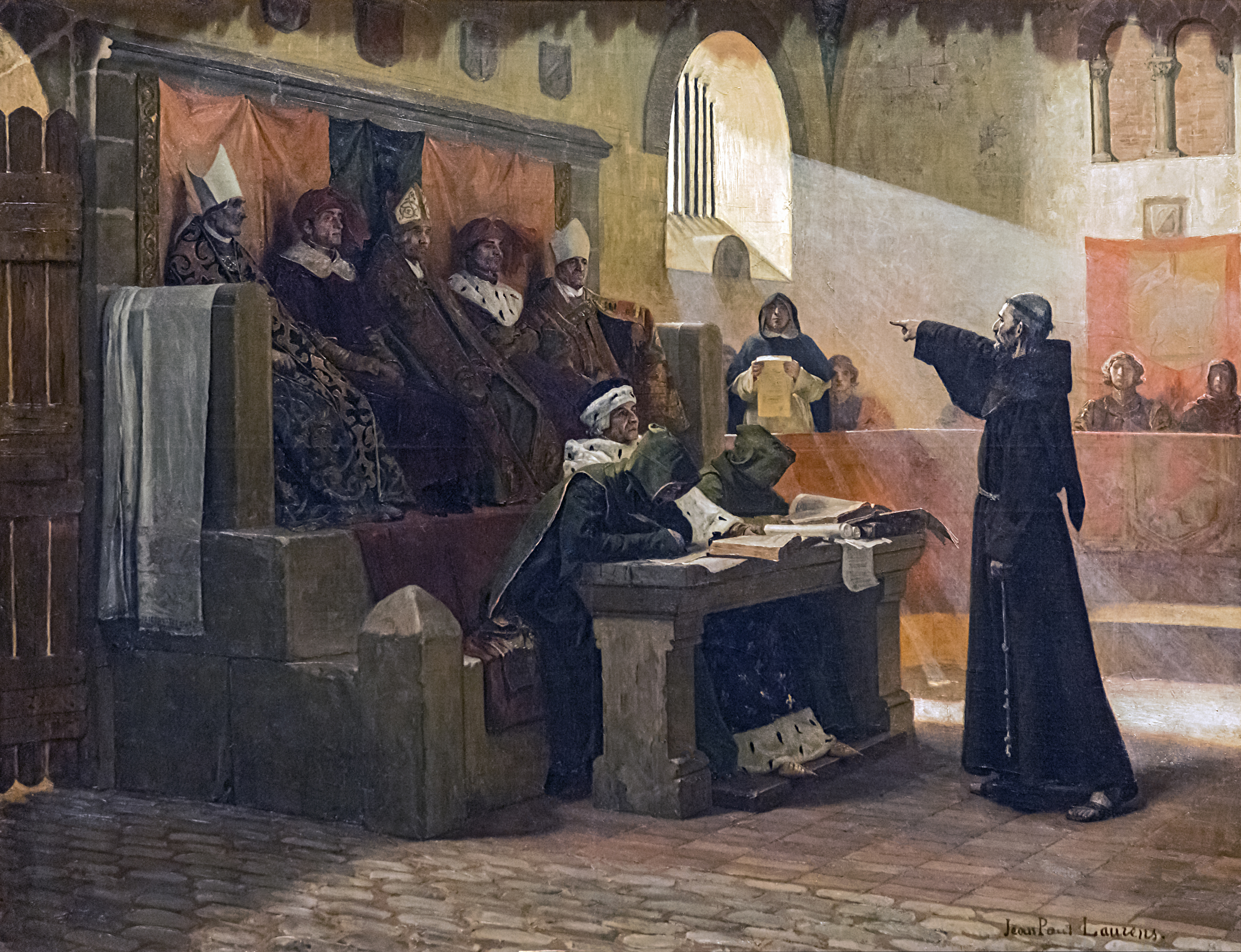
- L'agitateur du Languedoc by Jean-Paul Laurens at Musée des Augustins

Orders
- Ordination: Order of Friars Minor
- Rank: Friar

Personal details
- Born: c. 1260-1270 Montpellier, France
- Died: 1320 Carcassonne, France
- Denomination: Roman Catholic

Bernard Délicieux (c. 1260-1270 – 1320) was a Spiritual Franciscan friar who resisted the Inquisition in Carcassonne and Languedoc region of southern France.

== Early life ==
Born in Montpellier, France sometime in 1260-1270, Délicieux joined the Franciscan Order in 1284 and worked in Paris prior to the start of the fourteenth century.

== Agitator of Languedoc ==
In c. 1299, Délicieux became prior of the Franciscan convent in Carcassonne. In 1299, he led a revolt against the city's inquisitors, which prevented the arrest of two heretics sheltered in the Franciscan convent.

In July 1300, Délicieux appealed the accusation that Castel Fabre, deceased in 1278 and buried at the Franciscan convent, was a heretic. Délicieux claimed the inquisition registers were fraudulent and contained accusations from non-existent informants. This incident caused the inquisitors to temporarily flee Carcassonne.

In 1301, Délicieux befriended the newly appointed viceroy of Languedoc, Jean de Picquigny. Together, they visited King Philip The Fair in October and argued that Carcassonne inquisitor Foulques de Saint-Georges and Bishop Castanet were corrupt and abused their power, and thereby endangered loyalty to the French Kingdom. As a result, friar Foulques was reassigned and support from royal constables to arrest subjects suspected of heresy was reduced. Bishop Castanet was fined 20,000 livres and no longer was the noble (secular) ruler of Albi (only the church).

In c. 1302, Délicieux was transferred from Carcassonne to the Franciscan convent in Narbonne, but he travelled extensively throughout Languedoc preaching. In the spring, a second visit to the royal court failed to release the inquisition prisoners from Albi and Carcassonne.

In 1303, Délicieux returned to Carcassonne and pressured to reveal the secret accord of 1299, which reversed Carcassonne's earlier excommunication in 1297 by the inquisitor Nicholas d'Abbeville. On August 4, 1303, Délicieux gave a fiery sermon and claimed the 1299 accord admitted people of Carcassonne were (reformed) heretics and, hence, liable to be burned at the stake if they found to have relapsed. The following week, the inquisitor Geoffroy d'Ablis tried to dispel the accusations that the accord was unfair for Carcassonne, but a riot ensued. Based upon encouragement from Délicieux and to reduce tensions between the townsfolk and the inquisitors, Jean de Picquigny, backed by royal troops, forcibly transferred the prisoners from inquisitor's jail to the more humane royal jail.

In January 1304, Délicieux and Picquigny met with King Philip The Fair in Toulouse along with Dominican and other church officials as well as town representatives from Carcassonne and Albi. However, Délicieux angered the King by suggesting he was a foreign occupier of Languedoc. Consequently, there was no policy change - the inquisition would continue under oversight from local bishops.

In the spring of 1304, Délicieux travelled to Kingdom of Majorca to encourage Prince Ferran to back a revolt in Languedoc as an alternate ruler. However, King Jaume, an ally of King Philip, learned of the plot and beat his son, Prince Ferran, and ejected Délicieux from his kingdom.

== First arrest ==
On April 16, 1304, Pope Benedict XI wrote a bull Ea nobis ordering the Franciscans to arrest Délicieux for "saying such things as we must not". However, the order was unfulfilled due to Benedict XI's death.

Délicieux's succession plot was uncovered by royal authorities in the fall of 1304 and he travelled to Paris to attempt to gain an audience with King Philip IV. In Paris, Délicieux was placed under house arrest, but unpunished.

Upon installment of Pope Clement V in 1305, Délicieux was transferred to the papal authority, where he formed part of the Pope's entourage that ultimately moved to Avignon in 1309. Shortly thereafter (c. 1310), Délicieux was released and joined the Spiritual Franciscan convent in Béziers.

== Second arrest and trial ==
In April 1317, Pope John XXII ordered the Spiritual Franciscans from Béziers and Narbonne, including Délicieux, to come to Avignon and answer for their disobedience. Upon arrival, Délicieux was arrested. Over the next year, he was interrogated and tortured. Bernard de Castanet created forty charges, which were later expanded to sixty-four charged by Bernard Gui. In short, the charges against Délicieux were:

1. Disobeying the Franciscan Order as a Spiritual
2. Treason against the French King
3. Murdering Pope Benedict XI
4. Obstructing the Inquisition

Délicieux was transferred from Avignon to Carcassonne for his trial, which ran from September 12 to December 8, 1319. The judges and prosecutors were Jacques Fournier, the Bishop of Pamiers and future Pope Benedict XII, and Raimond de Mostuéjouls, the Bishop of St. Papoul.

Following torture and threat of excommunication, Délicieux confessed to the charge of obstructing the Inquisition. Délicieux was also found guilty of treason, but not guilty of murdering Pope Benedict XI. No verdict was given for being a Spiritual Franciscan, the original reason for his arrest in Avignon. As punishment, Délicieux was defrocked and sentenced to life in prison in solitary confinement. Though the judges sentencing Délicieux ordered that his penance of chains, bread and water be omitted in view of his frailty, age and prior torture, Pope John XXII countermanded their order and delivered the friar to inquisitor Jean de Beaune. Serving this harsh sentence, Délicieux died shortly thereafter in early 1320.

== Bibliography ==
- (in French) Jean-Louis Biget, Autour de Bernard Délicieux. Franciscains et société en Languedoc entre 1295 et 1330, in « Mouvements Franciscains et société française. XIII^{e}-XX^{e} siècle », André Vauchez ed., Paris, Beauchesne, 1984.
- Friedlander, Alan (2009). The Hammer of the Inquisitors: Brother Bernard Délicieux & the Struggle Against the Inquisition in Fourteenth-Century France. Cultures, beliefs, and traditions. Vol. V. 9. Leiden, Netherlands; Boston, MA: Brill Publishers. ISBN 9789004115194. OCLC 607468511.
- Friedlander, Alan (1966). "Processus Bernardi Delitiosi : the trial of Fr. Bernard Délicieux, 3 September-8 December 1319". Transactions of the American Philosophical Society. 86 (1). Philadelphia: American Philosophical Society. ISBN 9780871698612. ISSN 0065-9746. OCLC 34484357.
- Given, James Buchanan (2001). Inquisition and medieval society: power, discipline, and resistance in Languedoc. Cornell University Press.
- (in French) Barthélemy Hauréau, Bernard Délicieux et l'Inquisition albigeoise, 1300-1320, Paris, Hachette, 1877.
- Stephen O'Shea, The Friar Of Carcassonne, Douglas & McIntyre, 2011.
- Sullivan, Karen (2011). The inner lives of medieval inquisitors. University of Chicago Press.
- (in French) Julien Théry, "Une politique de la terreur : l'évêque d'Albi Bernard de Castanet (v. 1240-1317) et l'Inquisition", dans Les inquisiteurs. Portraits de défenseurs de la foi en Languedoc (XIIIe-XIVe s.), dir. L. Albaret, Toulouse : Privat, 2001, p. 71-87, free access & download online.
- (in French) Julien Théry, "L’hérésie des bons hommes. Comment nommer la dissidence religieuse non vaudoise ni béguine en Languedoc (XIIe-début du XIVe siècle) ?", Heresis, 36-37, 2002, p. 75-117, at p. 115-116.
