= Bernard de Castanet =

French lawyer, judge, diplomat, bishop and cardinal

His Eminence Bernard de Castenet
- Cardinal-Bishop
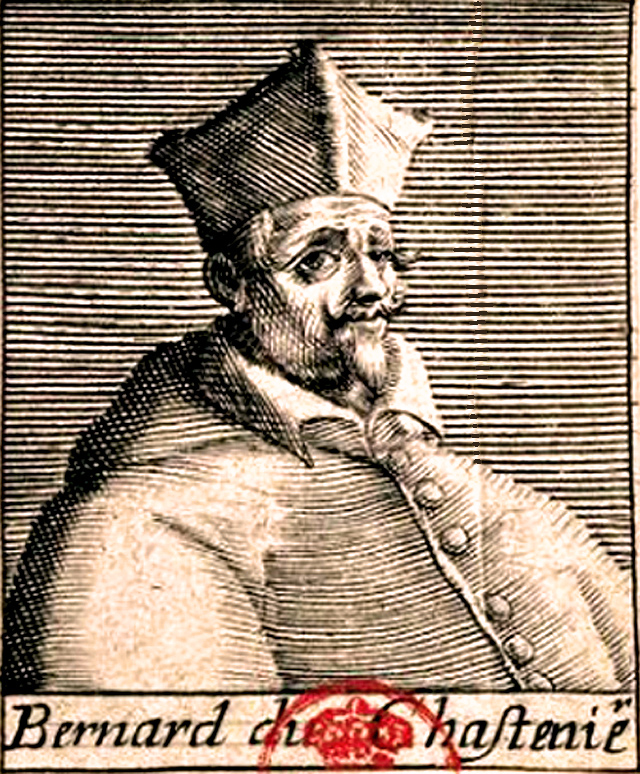
- Diocese: Albi (1276-1308); Le Puy (1308-1316); Porto (1316–1317)

Orders
- Consecration: 1276 by Pope Innocent V
- Created cardinal: 18 December 1316 by Pope Clement V
- Rank: Cardinal Bishop

Personal details
- Born: c. 1240 Montpellier FR
- Died: 14 August 1317 Avignon FR
- Residence: Avignon, Albi, Le Puy
- Occupation: lawyer, diplomat, administrator
- Profession: bishop
- Education: Doctor of Law, Montpellier

Bernard de Castanet (c. 1240 – 14 August 1317) was a French lawyer, judge, diplomat, bishop and cardinal of the Roman Catholic Church. Castanet was not a Dominican, though he had an excellent relationship with the order of the Preachers and occasionally exercised the office of inquisition as a bishop of Albi and a representative of the inquisitor of Carcassonne.

== Early life ==
Castanet was probably born in or next to Montpellier, on the Mediterranean coast of the Midi, and obtained a law degree from the University of Montpellier. By January 1266 he was a Professor of Civil Law, Papal Chaplain, and an Auditor Causarum at the Papal Court, which at that time was settled in Perugia. In February 1267 he was a nuntius of the Pope, and had an appointment as Canon in the Cathedral Chapter of Orléans; during a legation in Lombardy he was ordered to find a suitable person to be Abbot of the monastery of S. Thomas at Cremona.

He conducted diplomacy for the Church in Italy and Germany. In April 1268 he was sent to King Louis IX of France, to whom he would explain why the legatio to Germany (in Teutoniam) had been postponed for so long. He was also sent to King James of Aragon, to compose matters in the struggle between the Bishop of Maguelonne and the law faculty of Montpellier over the right to grant licentiates. In 1268, while he was papal legate in the Rhineland, he necessarily became involved in the case of Archbishop-elect Henry, who had been accused before Pope Urban IV of simony, sacrilege, perjury, homicide, and other various crimes, and was named Administrator of the Diocese of Trier.

On 9 December 1272, Pope Gregory X named Bernard de Castenet Archdeacon of Majorca, with a prebend and the office of Provost of the Cathedral Chapter of Girona. He was not expected, of course, to appear on Majorca or visit Gerona; the positions were intended to be benefices. On 30 August 1274, he was named Archdeacon of Fenolet with a canonry and prebend in the Cathedral Chapter of Narbonne. Attached to the Archdeaconry were a prebend in the Cathedral of Orléans and the parish church of Saint-Julien de Asiliano.

== Bishop of Albi ==
Castanet was appointed the Bishop of Albi on 7 March 1276 by Pope Innocent V. Two days later Bishop-elect Bernard was sent as a nuncio by Pope Innocent to Rudolf, King of the Romans to persuade the King not to come to Italy just yet, but to send nuncios to work out the difficulties in their proposed treaty. On his return he was consecrated a bishop by Pope Innocent V personally. He was released from the promise to engage in an ad limina visit to the Papal Curia every other year by Pope John XXI on 1 December 1276.

In his office as Bishop of Albi, Castenet engaged in a power struggle with the local landowners. He used accusations of heresy and the inquisition to control and punish those who opposed his right to arrest any citizen in the diocese and other political power prerogatives he held.

In 1287 Castanet ordered the start of construction on a new fortress-like cathedral at Albi.

According to Jean de Joinville, Bishop Bernard de Castanet accompanied Archbishop Guillaume de Flavacourt of Rouen to Rome to carry out the final negotiations with Pope Boniface VIII for the canonization of Louis IX of France, the grandfather of Philip IV.

On 15 July 1304, King Philip IV wrote a letter to Bishop de Castanet, thanking him for the subsidy which he had sent in his own name and in the name of the diocese of Albi, for the supply of the army in Flanders.

In 1307, he was accused of murder, pastoral neglect, simony, cruelty in the exercise of justice, and other offenses to the number of forty-two. The case was carried to the Papal Curia by two Canons of Albi, Sicardus Alamani and Bernardus Asturtionis. Pope Clement V assigned the case for judicial inquiry to Cardinal Berengar Fredol the Elder, who judged that the charges were serious enough to warrant Bishop Castanet's suspension from his temporal and spiritual authority, and to warrant the appointment of three prelates to examine witnesses on certain points set down in writing by the Cardinal. The Commission took 114 depositions, for the most part from favorers, parents of friends of "heretics". The Bishop appealed. Pope Clement then, on 27 July 1308, revoked the authority he had given to Cardinal Fredoli, and therefore to the commission, and by papal authority restored the Bishop and removed the taint of infamy which the original accusations had brought, restoring his bona fama. On 30 July 1308 Bishop Bernard de Castanet was transferred to the diocese of Le Puy-en-Velay. He presided over that diocese until he was named a Cardinal on 18 December 1316, and promoted to the Suburbicarian Diocese of Porto.

== Cardinal Bishop of Porto ==
Pope John XXII, an old friend, made Castanet a cardinal on 17 December 1316, and he joined the Papal Curia. On 18 December, the Pope granted him the privilege (this one time) of conferring benefices in the city of Albi and the diocese of Albi, which had fallen vacant; he was also given the privilege (this one time) of having himself absolved from sentences of excommunication and irregularity. In a privilegium of 20 December he is called the Bishop of Porto and Santa Rufina and former bishop of Albi, and given the privilege of lifting interdicts in the diocese of Albi. On 25 December, Jacques de Casalibus, who held the Provostship of the Cathedral Chapter of Albi, was granted the enjoyment of the income of his benefices for a period of five years.

In Avignon, after the second arrest of the Spiritual Franciscan Bernard Délicieux, Cardinal Bernard wrote the first draft of his indictment. A more extensive draft was prepared by Bishop Bernard Gui, O.P., since death had claimed the Cardinal.

Cardinal de Castenet died on 14 August 1317.

== Sources ==
- Malcolm D. Lambert, The Cathars. p. 228
- Jean Bony, French Gothic Architecture. p. 449-451.
- Jean-Louis Biget, Un procès d’Inquisition à Albi en 1300, in Le crédo, la morale et l’Inquisition. Cahiers de Fanjeaux 6, 1971, p. 273-341.
- Jean-Louis Biget, La restitution des dîmes par les laïcs dans le diocèse d'Albi à la fin du XIIIe siècle, in Les évêques, les clercs et le roi (1250-1300). Cahiers de Fanjeaux 7, 1972, p. 211-283.
- Jean-Louis Biget, Les cathares devant les inquisiteurs en Languedoc, Revue du Tarn, 146, 1992, p. 227-242, reprinted in Jean-Louis Biget, Inquisition et société en pays d'Oc, XIIIe et XIVe siècles, Toulouse, Privat (Cahiers de Fanjeaux, hors-série, 2), 2014, p. 225-238.
- Patrick Gilli and Julien Théry, La vague guelfe dans l'Italie des communes urbaines après la bataille de Bénévent : une mission pontificale à Crémone et à Plaisance (1266-1267), in Le gouvernement pontifical et l'Italie des villes au temps de la théocratie (fin-XIIe-mi-XIVe s.), Montpellier, Presses universitaires de la Méditerranée, 2010, p. 113-200.
- Hiromi Haruna-Czaplicki, Le décor des manuscrits de Bernard de Castanet et l'enluminure toulousaine vers 1300, Mémoires de la Société archéologique du Midi de la France, t. LXVIII, 2008, p. 227-281.
- Sainte-Marthe, Denis de (1715). Gallia Christiana, In Provincias Ecclesiasticas Distributa (in Latin). Vol. Tomus primus. Paris: Excudebat Johannes-Baptista Coignard, Regis & Academiae Gallicae Architypographus. pp. 20–22.
- Julien Théry (2000), "Les Albigeois et la procédure inquisitoire. Le procès pontifical contre Bernard de Castanet, évêque d'Albi et inquisiteur (1307-1308)", Heresis, 33, 2000, p. 7-48, available online.
- Julien Théry (2003), Fama, enormia. L'enquête sur les crimes de l'évêque d'Albi Bernard de Castanet (1307-1308). Gouvernement et contestation au temps de la théocratie pontificale et de l'hérésie des bons hommes, thèse de doctorat en Histoire, Faculté de Géographie, Histoire, Histoire de l'Art et Tourisme, Université Lumière Lyon 2, 2003, 3 vol. (résumé).
- Julien Théry (2001), "Une politique de la terreur : l'évêque d'Albi Bernard de Castanet (v. 1240-1317) et l'Inquisition", in Les inquisiteurs. Portraits de défenseurs de la foi en Languedoc (XIIIe-XIVe s.), dir. L. Albaret, Toulouse : Privat, 2001, p. 71-87, available online.
- Julien Théry, "Fama : Public Opinion as a Legal Category. Inquisitorial Procedure and the Medieval Revolution in Government (12th-14th centuries)", in Micrologus, 32 (« 'Dicitur'. Hearsay in Science, Memory and Poetry »), 2024, p. 153-193, online.
- Julien Théry (2012), "Cum verbis blandis et sepe nephandis. Une mission pontificale en Lombardie après la bataille de Bénévent (1266-1267)", in Legati e delegati papali. Profili, ambiti d’azione e tipologie di intervento nei secoli XII-XIII, dir. Maria Pia Alberzoni, Claudia Zey, Milan, Vita & pensiero, 2012, p. 195-218, available online.
- Julien Théry-Astruc (2014), "Luxure cléricale, gouvernement de l'Église et royauté capétienne au temps de la 'Bible de saint Louis'", Revue Mabillon, 25, p. 165-194, at p. 174-177, online.
- Julien Théry-Astruc (2016), « The Heretical Dissidence of the ‘Good Men’ in the Albigeois (1276-1329) : Localism and Resistance to Roman Clericalism », in « Cathars in Question », ed. by Antonio Sennis, York Medieval Press, 2016, p. 79-111, online.

Catholic Church titles
Preceded by Bernard II. de Combret	Bishop of Albi; 7 March 1276–1308	Succeeded by Bertrand des Bordes
Preceded by Jean de Comines	Bishop of Le Puy-en-Velay; 1308 – 1317	Succeeded by Guillaume de Brosse
