= Jean Marie Henri Legrez =

French Dominican friar

The Most Reverend Jean-Marie-Henri Legrez O.P.
- Archbishop of Albi
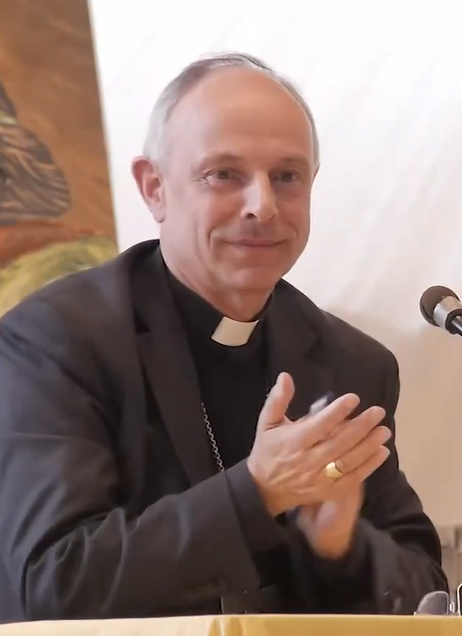
- Archbishop Legrez in 2015
- Church: Roman Catholic Church
- Archdiocese: Albi
- See: Albi
- Appointed: 2 February 2011
- Installed: 3 April 2011
- Predecessor: Pierre-Marie Joseph Carré
- Previous post: Bishop of Saint-Claude (2005-11)

Orders
- Ordination: 27 June 1976
- Consecration: 23 October 2005 by André Jean René Lacrampe

Personal details
- Born: Jean-Marie-Henri Legrez; 29 May 1948 (age 78) Paris, France
- Education: University of Nanterre
- Motto: Gaudium de veritate
- Coat of arms

Jean Legrez (born 29 May 1948 in Paris) is a French Dominican friar, and since February 2011 Archbishop of Albi.

== Biography ==
After pursuing a course in Modern Literature at the University of Nanterre, obtaining a Licenciate, he joined the Dominicans and continued his studies in literature and began philosophy at the Strasbourg Dominican convent. He continued his training in the Dominican convents of Paris and Toulouse, obtaining a degree of Master of Theology. He was ordained a priest on 27 June 1976.

After serving as vicar (Assistant Pastor) in a parish dependent upon the Toulouse Dominican convent, he participated in the foundation of two monastic fraternities in the dioceses of Aix and Avignon. In 1983 he became Prior of the monastic brotherhood in Lyon and parish priest (curate) at the church of Saint Nizier (1983).

In 1996, he returned to the Dominican Convent of Saint-Lazare in Marseille, where he served as the Sub-Prior from 1997 to 2001 and Prior to 2005. During this period, from 1997 to 2005, he taught sacramental theology and liturgy at the seminary of the Diocese of Fréjus-Toulon. Legrez was the national chaplain of the Centre de liaison des équipes de recherche - Amour et Famille from 1998 to 2001; the organization promotes the rhythm method of natural conception and opposes conjugal violence. It seeks to indoctrinate youth into Catholic principles of chastity, and it provides "family monitors" for natural family planning.

He was appointed bishop of Saint-Claude 22 August 2005, and was consecrated on 23 October by Bishop André Lacrampe, Archbishop of Besançon.

On 2 February 2011 he transferred to the archiepiscopal seat of Albi. Legrez was installed at Albi on Sunday, 3 April by Archbishop Le Gall, Metropolitan Archbishop of the Province.

Within the Bishops' Conference of France, Legrez has been a member of the "Commission for Consecrated Life" since 2014.

== Writings ==
- Jean Legrez (2015). Le Credo, expliqué (in French). Perpignan: Éditions Artège. ISBN 978-2-36040-718-7.
- Jean Legrez (2016). Figures spirituelles chez saint Luc (in French). Perpignan: Artège. ISBN 978-2-36040-688-3.

== Political views ==
On January 9, 2008, he signed with the two other bishops of Franche-Comté a statement:

- inviting electors to vote at this "important moment in the democratic life"
- recalling the challenges of political life, which "concerns indeed the future, so no one is left behind, that we should live in communities where peace, justice and fraternity reign; that we should be committed to sustainable development, the safeguarding of creation, solidarity "
- encouraging those who "accept municipal offices, often increasingly heavy.

On the bill opening marriage to same-sex couples, on 17 October 2012 he stated in the weekly "Le Journal d'Ici" that gay marriage "est idiot." It is "the beginning of madness" and "it denies nature" by allowing such a right. He also considered it preferable to use the words "contract or covenant" because "marriage is the union of a man and a woman in order to be fruitful." In these sentiments, he was echoing the official position of the Vatican and Pope Benedict XVI.

== See also ==
- Jean Legrez article, French Wikipedia
