= Jean de Picquigny =

14th-century French viceroy of Languedoc

- Réformateur-Enquêteur
- Died: 1304; Perugia

Jean de Picquigny was a French noble from Amiens who was viceroy of Languedoc. Known for arresting Bishop Bernard Saisset in 1301 as well as freeing Inquisition prisoners in Carcassonne, along with Bernard Délicieux, in 1303. For these controversial actions, he was excommunicated in 1303.
