= Yvon Thébert =

Yvon Thébert (20 February 1943 – 2 February 2002, aged 58) was a 20th-century French archaeologist and historian of marxist inspiration.

== Biography ==
Agrégé d'histoire, assistant at the Faculty of Arts and Human Sciences of Tunis (1969-1971), a member of the École française de Rome (1971), Yvon Thébert taught at the école normale supérieure de Fontenay-Saint-Cloud from 1973. His major excavation sites were Bulla Regia (from 1965 to 1985) and the Vigna Barberini on the Palatine Hill in Rome (from 1986 to 1997).

Continuing the excavations he conducted at Bulla Regia, he devoted much of his research to Roman Africa and the architecture of Roman baths, topic of his State thesis. He also devoted much of his work to the study of social and cultural mechanisms of ancient history, offering a critical analysis of the concepts of romanization or conquest, from the analysis of social hierarchies rather than cultural hyphenation.

== Publications ==
=== Books ===
- 1977: Azedine Beschaouch, Roger Hanoune, Yvon Thébert (éd.), Les ruines de Bulla Regia, CEFR 28, Rome
- 1989: Jean-Louis Biget, Jean-CIaude Hervé, Yvon Thébert (éd.), Les cadastres anciens des villes et leur traitement par l'informatique : actes de la table ronde, CEFR 120, Rome
- 1993: Henri Broise, Yvon Thébert (éd.), Recherches archéologiques franco-tunisiernnes à Bulla Régia. 2. 1, Les architectures. Les thermes memmiens : étude architecturale et histoire urbaine, CEFR 28/2, 1, Rome
- 2000: Henri Broise, Patrick Boucheron, Yvon Thébert (éd.), La brique antique et médiévale : production et commercialisation d'un matériau : actes du colloque international de Saint-Cloud, 16-18 novembre 1995, CEFR 272, Rome
- 2003: Yvon Thébert, Thermes romains d'Afrique du Nord et leur contexte méditerranéen : études d'histoire et d'archéologie, École française de Rome

=== Articles ===
- 1973: La romanisation d'une cité indigène d'Afrique : Bulla Regia, Mélanges de l'École française de Rome. Antiquité, Année 1973, 1, (pp. 247–312).
- 1978: Yvon Thébert, « Romanisation et déromanisation en Afrique : histoire décolonisée ou histoire inversée ? », Annales. Histoire, Sciences Sociales, v.33, n° 1, (pp. 64–82).
- 1980: Économie, société et politique aux deux derniers siècles de la république romaine », Annales. Histoire, Sciences Sociales, 5, (pp. 895-911)
- 1980: Réflexions sur l'utilisation du concept d'étranger : évolution et fonction de l'image du Barbare à Athènes à l'époque classique », Diogène, 112, (pp. 96–115).
- 1983: L'évolution urbaine dans les provinces orientales de l'Afrique romaine tardive », Opus, 2,(pp. 99-131).
- 1982: recension of A. Giardina and A. Schiavone (dir.), Società romana e produzione schiavistica, Vol. I., L'Italia : insediamenti e forme economiche, vol. II, Merci, mercati e scambi nel Mediterraneo, vol III, Modelli etici, diritto e trasformazioni sociali in Annales. Histoire, Sciences Sociales, 37, 5-6, (pp. 788-791)
- 1985: "Vie privée et architecture domestique en Afrique romaine", in Paul Veyne dir., Histoire de la vie privée I, Paris, (pp. 301–415).
- 1986: "Permanence et mutations des espaces urbains dans les villes d'Afrique du Nord orientale : de la cité antique à la cité médiévale", Actes du IVe congrès international d'histoire et de civilisation du Maghreb, Tunis, 11–13 April 1986, Cahiers de Tunisie, 34, (pp. 31–46).
- 1988: À propos du "triomphe du christianisme", Dialogues d'Histoire Ancienne, 14, (pp. 277-345).
- 1988: with Filippo Coarelli, "Architecture funéraire et pouvoir : réflexions sur l'hellénisme numide", Mélanges de l'École française de Rome: Antiquité, Année 1988, 2, (pp. 1761–818)
- 1990: with J.-L. Biget, "L'Afrique après la disparition de la cité classique : cohérence et ruptures dans l'histoire maghrébine" in L'Afrique dans l'Occident romain. Actes du colloque de Rome, 3–5 December 1987, C.E.F.R. 134, Rome, (pp. 575–602).
- 2002: "L'esclave" in Andrea Giardina dir., L'homme romain, Paris, Éditions du Seuil, (pp. 179–225)(translation of the Italian edition, 1989)
- 1995: "Nature des frontières de l'empire romain : le cas germain", in Aline Rousselle éd., Frontières terrestres, frontières célestes dans l'antiquité, Perpignan, (pp. 221–235)
- 2005: "Royaumes Numides et hellénisme", Afrique et histoire, 2005, 3, (pp. 29–37) (supplemented edition of an article written for the exhibition catalog "Carthage" (Petit-Palais, 1995).

== Bibliography ==
- Afrique & histoire, vol. 3, 2005/1 Dossier: "Afriques romaines: impérialisme antique, imaginaire colonial. Relectures et réflexions à l'école d'Yvon Thébert".
- Antiquité tardive, volume 10/2002, p. 16-17.
- A. Beschaouch, Yvon Thébert, Antiquités africaines, t. 38–39, 2002–2003, p. 7-10 (obituary)

== See also ==
- North Africa during Antiquity
