= Archdiocese of Albi =

Catholic archdiocese in France

Archdiocese of Albi (-Castres-Lavaur) Archidioecesis Albiensis (-Castrensis-Vauriensis) Archdiocèse d'Albi (-Castres-Lavaur)

Catholic
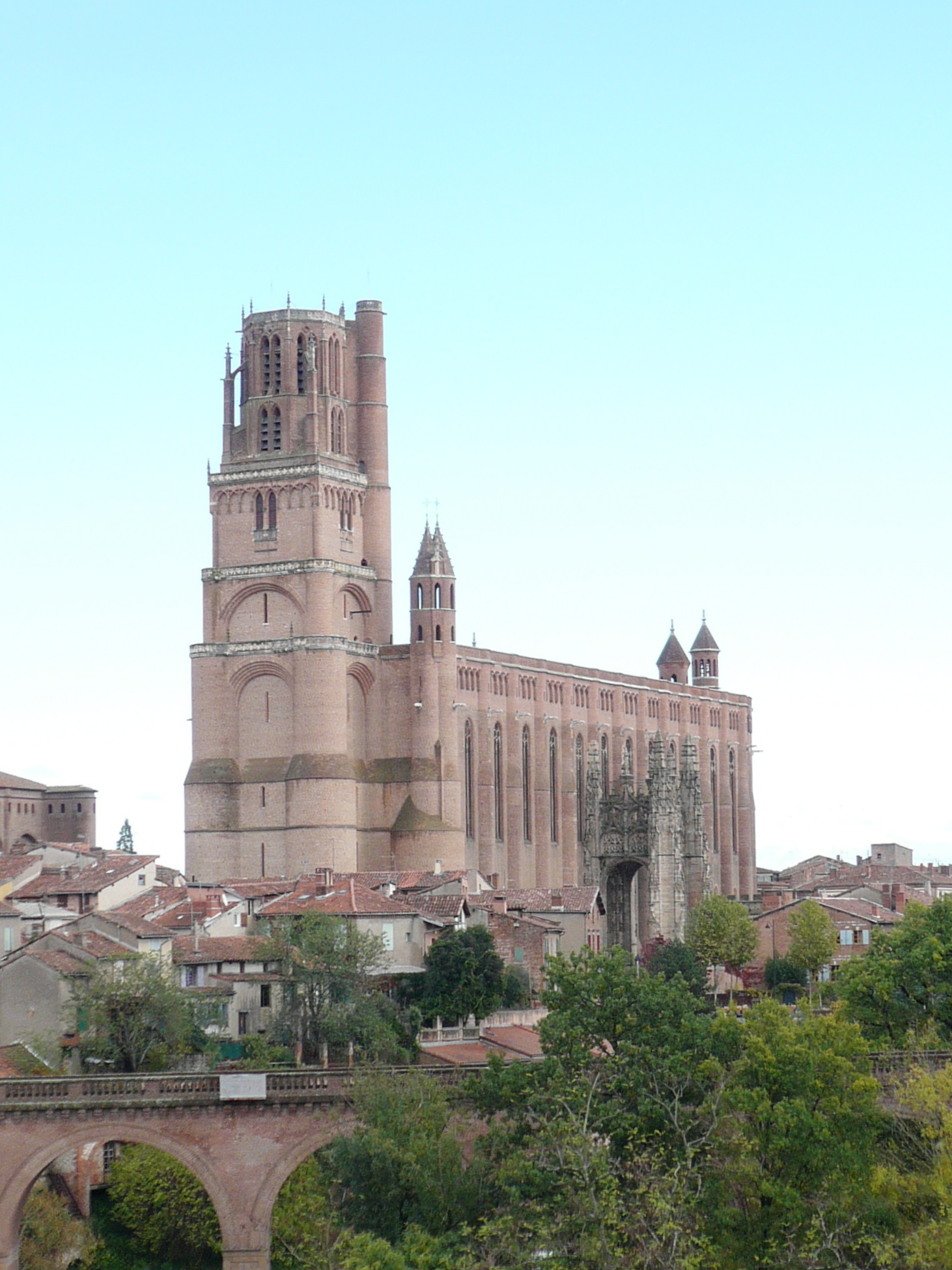
- Albi Cathedral

Location
- Country: France
- Ecclesiastical province: Toulouse
- Metropolitan: Archdiocese of Toulouse

Statistics
- Area: 5,780 km^{2} (2,230 sq mi)
- Population: Total; Catholics: (as of 2022); 399,108; 291,000 (est.) (72.9%)
- Parishes: 507

Information
- Denomination: Roman Catholic
- Sui iuris church: Latin Church
- Rite: Roman Rite
- Established: c. 5th Century; 3 October 1678 (Archdiocese of Albi); 17 February 1922 (Archdiocese of Albi-Castres-Lavaur)
- Cathedral: Cathedral Basilica of St. Cecilia in Albi
- Patron saint: Saint Cecilia
- Secular priests: 100 (Diocesan); 25 (Religious Orders); 25 Permanent Deacons

Current leadership
- Pope: Leo XIV
- Archbishop: Jean-Louis Balsa
- Metropolitan Archbishop: Guy de Kerimel
- Bishops emeritus: Jean Legrez

Map

Website
- Website of the Archdiocese

The Archdiocese of Albi (Latin: Archidioecesis Albiensis–Castrensis–Vauriensis); (French: Archidiocèse d'Albi–Castres–Lavaur) is a Latin archdiocese of the Catholic Church in France. (Note: A suffragan diocese is usually a diocese rather than an archdiocese and led by a bishop rather than an archbishop.) It is suffragan to the Archdiocese of Toulouse, and it comprises the department of Tarn.

In the 12th century, the spread of alternative beliefs in the region led to the arrival of church authorities to refute and try the "heretics". Among them were the Good Men, from whom the Cathars became known as Albigensians. The latter held their own council in 1167, and their bishopric was defined. In 1179, Pope Alexander III summoned the Third Lateran Council, where he condemned them. In the early 1200s, a religious and military crusade was waged against the movement and they were largely destroyed.

The Diocese of Albi was established in the 5th century and was under the Archdiocese of Bourges for centuries. On 3 October 1678, Pope Innocent XI made it an archdiocese. With the arrival of the French Revolution, it was suppressed in favor of Tarn. With the Concordat of 1801, it was integrated into the See of Montpellier. Finally, with the Concordat of 11 June 1817, the Archdiocese of Albi was restored.

In May 2018, Legrez restructured the diocese to reflect the reality of the church in the region. The total number of parishes, which had existed since the Middle Ages, were reduced from 503 to 21.

== History ==
Originally erected around the 5th century as the Diocese of Albi, the diocese was for centuries a suffragan of the Archdiocese of Bourges.

=== Growth of heresy ===
In 1145 Pope Eugenius sent Cardinal Albericus, the bishop of Ostia, to Toulouse as his legate against the Petrobusian heretics, and Cardinal Albericus took the Cistercian monk Bernard of Clairvaux along with him. Gofridus of Clarivaux, an associate of Bernard, left a highly colored account of Bernard's work in confuting the Petrobosian leader Henry of Lausanne; after several days of preaching in Toulouse, Bernard caused Henri to flee, but he was quickly captured and turned over to the bishop of Toulouse. Bernard also preached against the Manichaean heretics of the neighborhood, though at the castle-town of Verfeil, some ten miles east of Toulouse, he was completely unsuccessful.

The cardinal, followed some days later by Bernard, then visited Albi. The Cardinal's reception was cold and jeering, reflecting no doubt the well-known anti-clerical attitudes of the Albigensians, in particular the luxury and arrogance of the higher clergy. Bernard's reception was more friendly, his reputation as an ascetic and celibate approximating the Albigensian view of "the good men". He was favorably received in his sermon in the cathedral on 29 June, and, at least in his own imagination, he persuaded large numbers to return to the true and orthodox faith. His companion and biographer, Geoffrey of Auxerre, was less certain, an evaluation which appeared more realistic in the outcome. Geoffrey also wrote to the monks at Clairvaux that Bernard's return should be expected some time after the Octave of the Assumption (the last week of August). The cardinal was back with the pope in time for Christmas in Rome.

In 1147, while he was still on his journey to France, Pope Eugene III received reports, charges that Bishop Gilibertus of Poitiers was guilty of heresy; the information was brought by two of Gilibertus' own Archdeacons. Gilibertus was summoned to answer to the charges. As the two Archdeacons were returning to France, they consulted with the well-known Cistercian monk, Bernard of Clairvaux, who became eager to help them in bringing Gilibertus to account. The Bishop was examined first at Auxerre, then in Paris (April–June), and finally at the Council of Reims in March 1148.

In 1165 a judicial meeting was assembled by Bishop Guillaume de Dorgne of Albi at the castle-town of Lombers, two leagues (c. 10 miles) south of Albi, a place agreed upon by the "good men" (boni homines) of the Vaudois, where they believed they would be safe under the protection of the knights who held the castle in fief. The "good men" were under suspicion of heresy, and they were expected to answer the charges against them. The Bishop fortified his court with a large assembly of notables: the archbishop of Narbonne and the bishops of Agde, Lodève, Nîmes, and Toulouse; the abbots of S. Pons, Castres, Sendrac, Saint-Guilham, Gaillac, Candeil, and others; the provosts of Toulouse and of Albi; the archdeacons of Narbonne and Agde; Countess Constance of Toulouse, Trincavel the Vicomte of Béziers, and the Vicomte of Laurac; and practically the entire population of Albi and Lombers. Bishop Gaucelinus of Lodève, who acted as inquisitor, had six topics concerning the theological doctrine and practices of the "good men" on which he interrogated them closely, sometimes in fact engaging in debate. The "good men" refused to use or respond to arguments or texts from the Old Testament. They were reluctant to discuss the eucharist (though they admitted that any good man, cleric or layman could consecrate), marriage, or penance (They would only say that the sick could confess to anyone they wanted). In return, the "good men" accused the prelates of being guilty of unchristian greed and luxury, lupi rapaces, and they named Bishop William a heretic. Bishop Gaucelinus pronounced sentence on the "good men" as heretics, and offered them an oath of purgation in which they could demonstrate their orthodoxy. They refused. Bishop Guillaume could not bring himself to compel them to swear, or to impose a penalty, since there was considerable support among the people for their cause. Thereafter the "good men" were called Albigensians.

In 1167 the Albigensians were numerous and confident enough that they held their own Council at Saint-Felix-de-Caraman. A Bogomil bishop Nicetas, and Marcus, a representative of the Lombard community, were present. This council defined the geographical span of the Albigensian Bishoprics of Agenais, Toulouse, Albigeios and Carcasses (Carcassonne). The Albigensian bishop of Albi, Sicard Cellarier, took part.

In 1179 Pope Alexander III summoned a general council of the Church, which met in Rome at the Lateran Basilica beginning on 5 March, and came to be called the Third Lateran Council. The 27th Canon of the Council addressed the heresies which were to be found in Gascony, the Albigeois, and Toulouse (in Gasconia, Albegesio, et partibus Tolosanis, et aliis locis) under the names Cathars, Patrines, Publicani, and other names. Anathemas were hurled against them, forbidding anyone to favor or to do business with them in their homes or on their properties. In 1180 Pope Alexander appointed Cardinal Henri de Marsiac, who had once been Abbot of Clairvaux and who had been promoted Bishop of Albano at the Lateran Council, to serve as Legate in France against the Albigensians. In June 1181 he led a body of knights against the town of Lavaur, which served as the headquarters of the Cathar bishop of Toulouse. The Cardinal also held councils at Le Puy, Bazas, Limoges, Bourges and Bordeaux. He returned to Rome only after the death of Pope Alexander.

=== Albigensian Crusade ===
The Vicomté d'Albi was united with the crown by King Louis VIII in 1226, during his visit to the Albigeois in October.

In 1275 the Dominicans held their General Chapter meeting in Perpignan. At that meeting they took the decision to establish a convent of Dominicans in Albi, and they sent eight members of the Order to undertake the task. In the next year the convent opened, with Bernard Bociat elected the first Prior Conventual. The first stone of their church, Saint-Louis, was laid by Bishop de Castenet in 1293.

On 6 March 1474, King Louis XI of France by patent letters granted Bishop Louis d'Amboise and his successors the Presidency of the Three Estates of Languedoc, which included the lands of Perpignan and Roussillon, as well as the Bordelais and Guienne.

=== Archbishopric ===
On 3 October 1678, Pope Innocent XI, in the Bull Triumphans pastor aeternus, raised the diocese to the status of a metropolitan archbishopric. The province was composed of the dioceses of Albi, Rodez, Castres, Cahors, Vabres, and Mende. The bull was confirmed by King Louis XIV in letters patent dated 14 June 1680.

==== Cathedral and canons ====
The canons (priests) of the cathedral chapter of Albi had once lived under the rule of Saint Augustine, since perhaps the 11th century. Bishop Frotardus, at some point before his deposition in 1075, carried out a reform of the cathedral chapter, complaining of the greed, lack of chastity, and neglect of duty of the canons. Most of the canons returned to their duty. The document attesting to the reform mentions two sacristans, capiscolaris (cantor), a treasurer, and a dean. A provost is also mentioned under Frotardus.

Pope Boniface VIII, in a bull of 29 September 1297, secularized the canons. This led to an immediate and intense struggle between the bishop, Bernard de Castanet, and the canons of the cathedral chapter over the redistribution of the property and rights which had belonged to the monks of the monastery. Prebends had to be created, and issues over the rights of presentation to various churches and priories (which ones were to belong to the bishop, and which to the canons) had to be settled. The hostility that grew out of this situation certainly influenced the attempt in 1307–1308 to have Bishop de Castenet deposed by the pope.

The cathedral chapter was composed of seven dignities (not dignitaries) and twenty canons. The dignities were: the provost, the cantor, the succentor, the three archdeacons, and the theologian. Their prebends were granted by the bishop. In 1678 there were eight dignities, twenty canons, and forty-eight prebends. In 1747 there were nine dignities and twenty canons.

There was also a collegiate church in Albi, the Church of Saint-Salvi, which was also served by a college of canons, at least since the mid-eleventh century. The canons, twelve in number, followed the rule of Saint Augustine, and were headed by a provost. The provost was elected by the canons and confirmed by the bishop, and had the right to confer all the benefices that belonged to the collegiate church.

The Collège of Albi was established on 19 May 1623 by Bishop Alphonse d'Elbène and provided with an endowment of 3,000 livres. The Seminary of Albi was erected by the first archbishop, Hyacinthe Serroni, in 1684.

=== Revolution ===
In 1790 the National Constituent Assembly decided to bring the French church under the control of the state. Civil government of the provinces was to be reorganized into new units called 'départements', originally intended to be 83 or 84 in number. The dioceses of the Roman Catholic Church were to be reduced in number, to coincide as much as possible with the new departments. Since there were more than 130 bishoprics at the time of the Revolution, more than fifty dioceses needed to be suppressed and their territories consolidated. Clergy would need to take an oath of allegiance to the state and its constitution, specified by the Civil Constitution of the Clergy, and they would become salaried officials of the state. Both bishops and priests would be elected by special 'electors' in each department. This brought schism, since bishops would no longer need to be approved (preconised) by the papacy; the transfer of bishops, likewise, which had formerly been the exclusive prerogative of the pope in canon law, would be the privilege of the state; the election of bishops no longer lay with the Cathedral Chapters (which were all abolished), with other responsible clergy or the pope, but with electors who did not have to be Catholics or Christians.

A new civil department, called "Tarn", was created by the French Legislative Assembly. The old diocese of Albi was suppressed, and a new "Diocese of Tarn" was created, with its center at Albi. It was assigned as a suffragan to the "Metropole du Sud". Archbishop François-Joachim de Bernis of Albi refused to take the oath to the Civil Constitution of the Clergy, and therefore his see was declared by the Legislative Assembly to be vacant. Cardinal de Bernis died on 2 November 1794. His nephew and coadjutor succeeded to the diocese canonically, receiving the pallium on 1 June 1795. He did not actually resign canonically, however, until 2 March 1802.

The electors of Tarn, meeting at Castres on 13 March 1791, chose in his place Jean-Joachim Gausserand, who was a beneficier of the cathedral chapter of Albi and promoter forain of the district of Gaillac. He had been elected a deputy to the Estates General of 1789, and had taken the constitutional oath on 27 December 1790. He was consecrated a Constitutional Bishop in Paris at Notre Dame on 3 April 1791 by Constitutional Bishop Antoine-Adrien Lamourette. The consecration was valid, but canonically irregular, schismatic, and blasphemous (as a parody of genuine Catholic sacraments). Gausserand took possession of the diocese of Tarn on 1 May 1791. When religion was formally abolished in 1793 and replaced by the Cult of Reason, the bishop went into hiding, and his diocese was abolished; but, after the Terror, when it was restored, he found that more than 200 of his priests had resigned, and 40 of them had married. Gausserand held three synods in the diocese, in 1797 and 1801. He refused the opportunity to reconcile at the time of the Concordat of 1801. In 1808 he was struck with the interdict and he died in exile in Toulouse on 12 February 1820, without having been reconciled with the Roman Catholic Church.

=== Bourbon restoration ===
After the signing of the Concordat of 1801 with First Consul Napoleon Bonaparte, Pope Pius VII demanded the resignation of all bishops in France, in order to leave no doubt as to who was a legitimate bishop and who was a Constitutional imposter. He then immediately abolished all of the dioceses in France, for the same reason. Then he began to restore the old Ancien Régime dioceses, or most of them, though not with the same boundaries as before the Revolution, but instead taking account of the abolition of the Estates and Provinces and the creation of the new department system of civil government. The diocese of Albi was not one of those revived by Pope Pius VII in his bull Qui Christi Domini of 29 November 1801. The territory of the former diocese of Albi was assigned to the diocese of Montpellier, which also received the territories of the suppressed dioceses of Agde, Lavaur, Narbonne, Saint-Pons, and Vabres.

Following the Concordat of 11 June 1817, the archdiocese was restored in 1822 to its former borders and title.

During the First World War, 349 members of the clergy of the diocese of Albi were mobilized. Seventeen died, six won the Légion d'honneur, three won the Médaille militaire, and sixty-three were awarded the Croix de guerre.

=== 20th and 21st centuries ===
In February 1922, the name was changed to its current designation of the Archdiocese of Albi-Castres-Lavour.

In May 2018, Archbishop Jean Legrez restructured the diocese to take into account the severe decline in the number of priests and parishioners. The number of parishes was reduced from 503 to 21.

== Bishops and Archbishops ==
=== To 1000 ===
Clair
Anthimius

- c. 406: Diogenianus

[451: Anemius]

- 506: Sabinus
- 549: Ambroise
- 580–584: Salvius (Salvy)
- 585: Desiderius ((Didier))
- 614: Fredemundus
- 625–647: Constantius
- ?–664: Dido (Didon)
- c. 673: Richard
- 692–30. May 698: Citruin
- c. 700: Amarand
- 722: Hugo
- 734: Johannes
- c. 804: Deodatus (Verdatus)
- 825: Guilelmus
- 844: Balduin
- 854: Pandevius
- 876: Lupus
- 886: Eligius (Eloi)
- 887–891: Adolenus (Adolence)
- 921: Paterne
- 926: Godebric
- 936: Angelvin
- 941–942: Miron
- 961–967: Bernard
- 972: Frotaire (Frotarius)
- 975–987: Amelius or Ameil
- 990: Ingelbin
- 992: Honorat
- 998: Amblard

=== 1000–1300 ===
- 1020–1040: Amelius (or Ameil II).
- 1040–1054: Guilielmus
- 1062–1079: Frotardus
- 1079–1090: Guilelmus (III.)
- 1096: Galterus (Galterius, Walter, Gauthier)
- 1098–1099: Hugo II.
- 1100–1103: Adelgaire I.
- 1103: Arnaldus de Cecenno
- 1109–1110: Adelgarius.
- 1115: Sicard
- 1115–1125: Bertrandus
- 1125–1132: Humbertus
- 1136–1143: Hugo III.
- 1143–1155: Rigaud
- 1157–1174: Guilelmus

[Gérard]

- 1183: Claude André
- 1185–1227: Guilelmus Petri
- 1228–c. 1254: Durand
- 1254–c. 1271: Bernard II. de Combret

1271–1276: Sede Vacante

- 1276 – 1308: Bernard de Castanet

=== 1300–1500 ===
- 1308–1311: Bertrand des Bordes
- 1311–1314: Géraud II.
- 1314–1333: Béraud de Farges
- 1334–1337: Pierre de la Vie
- 1337: Bernard de Camiet
- 1337–1338: Guillaume Court
- 1339–1350: Pictavinus de Montesquiou
- 1351–1354: Arnaud Guillaume
- 1355–1379: Hugues Auberti (Hugo Alberti)
- 1379–1382: Dominique de Florence, O.P. (Avignon Obedience)
- 1382–1383: Jean de Saie (Avignon Obedience)
- 1383–1392: Guillaume de la Voulte (Avignon Obedience)
- 1393–1410: Dominique de Florence (again)
- 1410–1434: Pierre III. Neveu
- 1435: Bernard V. de Cazilhac
- 1435–1462: Robert Dauphin
- 1462–1473: Cardinal Jean Jouffroy
- 1474–1503: Louis d'Amboise, (the Elder)

=== 1500–1700 ===
- 1503–1510: Louis d'Amboise, the Younger (nephew)
- 1510–1511: Robert de Britto (Administrator)
- 1511–1515: Charles de Robertet
- 1515–1518: Jean-Jacques Robertet
- 1519–1520: Cardinal Adrien Gouffier de Boissy, Administrator.
- 1524–1528: Aymar Gouffier, O.S.B.
- 1528–1535: Antoine Duprat (Administrator)
- 1535–1550: Cardinal Jean de Guise-Lorraine
- 1550–1561: Louis de Guise-Lorraine (Administrator)
- 1561–1567: Cardinal Lorenzo Strozzi
- 1568–1574: Filippo de Rodolfis
- 1575–1588: Giuliano de Medici
- 1588–1608: Alphonse del Bene (d'Elbene)
- 1608–1635: Alphonse d'Elbene
- 1635–1676: Gaspard de Daillon du Lude
- 1678–1687: Hyacinthe Serroni, O.P. (first archbishop)

1687–1693: Sede Vacante

- 1693–1703: Charles Le Goux de la Berchère

=== 1700–present ===
- 1703–1722: Henri de Nesmond
- 1722–1747: Armand-Pierre de la Croix de Castries
- 1747–1759: Dominique de La Rochefoucauld
- 1759–1764: Léopold-Charles de Choiseul-Stainville
- 1764–1794: Cardinal François-Joachim de Pierre de Bernis
  - 3 April 1791: Jean-Joachim Gausserand
    (Constitutional Bishop of Tarn)
- 1794–1801: François de Pierre de Bernis

1801–1823: Sede Vacante

- 1823–1833: Charles Brault
- 1833–1842: François-Marie-Edouard de Gually
- 1842–1864: Jean-Joseph-Marie-Eugène de Jerphanion
- 1865–1875: Jean-Paul-François-Marie-Félix Lyonnet
- 1876–1884: Etienne-Emile Ramadié
- 1884–1899: Jean-Emile Fonteneau
- 1900–1918: Eudoxe-Irénée-Edouard Mignot
- 1918–1940: Pierre-Célestin Cézerac
- 1940–1956: Jean-Joseph-Aimé Moussaron
- 1957–1961: Jean-Emmanuel Marquès
- 1961–1974: Claude Dupuy
- 1974–1985: Robert-Joseph Coffy
- 1986–1988: Joseph-Marie-Henri Rabine
- 1989–1999: Roger Lucien Meindre
- 2000–2010: Pierre-Marie Joseph Carré
- 2011–2023: Jean Legrez, O.P.
- 2023–present: Jean-Louis Balsa

== See also ==
- Catholic Church in France
- List of Catholic dioceses in France
