= Bertrand des Bordes =

Bertrand des Bordes (died 1311) was a bishop of the Diocese of Albi and Roman Catholic Cardinal. He served as Chamberlain of Pope Clement V from 1307 to 1311.

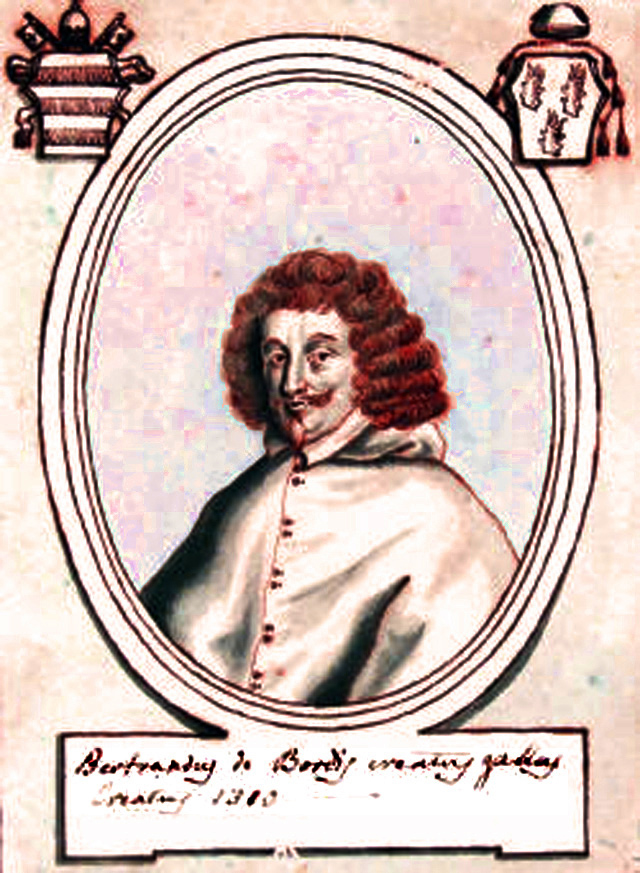
Image of Bertrand des Bordes, was a bishop.

== Family and early career ==
Bordes was born in Gascony. His family was not aristocratic in origin, as is evident from the fact that King Philip IV raised his brother Pierre to the lordship of the ville of Launac (diocese of Toulouse) in June 1311. Another brother, Guillaume, became Precentor of the Cathedral Chapter of Lectoure, and then, in 1311 Bishop of Lectoure. A Bernardus de Borda, who may have been Bertrand des Bordes' nephew, is recorded as an Ostiarius Domini Nostri Papae at Avignon in 1327.

Bertrand was made a Canon of the Cathedral Chapter of Lectoure on 27 July 1305, and was given the reservation on a prebend and a dignity in the Cathedral Chapter. He was permitted to keep the canonry and prebend which he already held in the Cathedral of Saint Hilary in Poitiers, along with five churches in the diocese of Poitiers and the diocese of Agen.

== Chamberlain and bishop ==
In September 1307 he succeeded Arnaud de Canteloupe, a nephew of Pope Clement V, as Papal Chamberlain, a position he was still holding at the time of his death. He was made a member of King Edward II's council in Aquitaine on 14 March 1308, and on 4 March 1308 he was granted an annual pension of 30 marks by the King. Bertrand's family were, after all, subjects of the King of England as Duke of Aquitaine.

He was appointed Bishop of Albi on 30 July 1308 by Pope Clement V, though he continued to live at the Papal Court in Avignon and serve as Papal Chamberlain. He and his agents worked vigorously in the diocese of Albi to recover the income from the tithes (dîmes), which had been alienated in earlier years and not yet recovered by Bishop de Castenet.

== Cardinal ==
Archbishop Bertrand des Bordes was named a Cardinal by Pope Clement V on 19 December 1310, and assigned the title of Saints John and Paul. On 15 January 1311 he was granted an annual pension of 40 marks by Bishop Henry Woodlock of Winchester.

Cardinal Bertrand des Bordes died on 11 September 1311.

== Sources ==
- Baluze, Étienne; Guillaume Mollat, ed.; Vitae paparum avenionensium Tome II (Paris 1927). [annotated reprint of the edition of Paris 1693]
- Eubel, Conradus, ed. (1913). Hierarchia catholica, Tomus 1 (second ed.). Münster: Libreria Regensbergiana. pp. 333–334. (in Latin)
- Salvador Miranda, The Cardinals of the Holy Roman Church, Biographical Dictionary.
