= CRAI =

Italian company

- Founded: 1973; 52 years ago
- Website: www.crai-supermercati.it

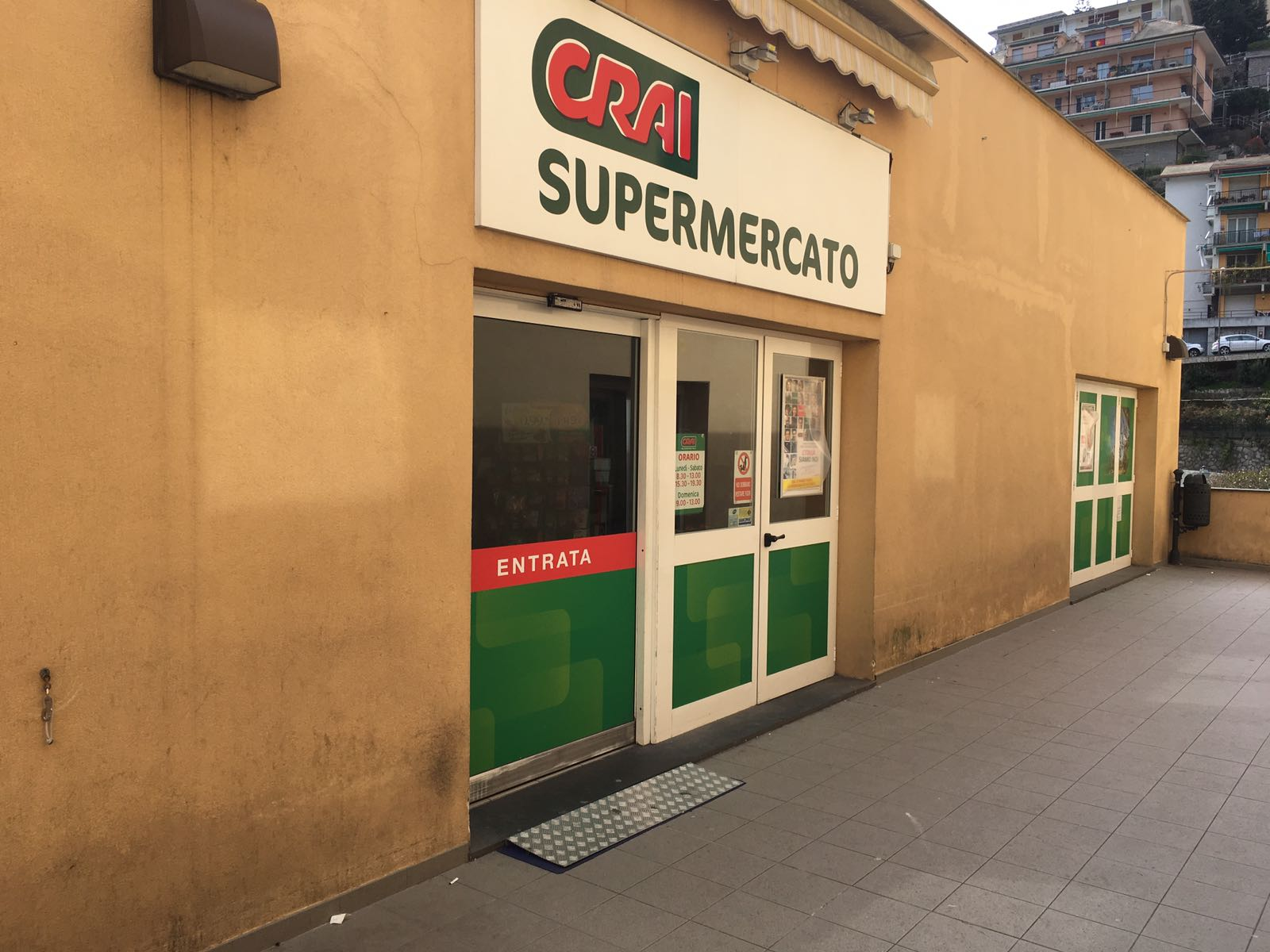
The entrance of a typical Crai shop in the commune of Sori, Liguria in the Metropolitan City of Genoa, branded with the Crai name

CRAI (Commissionarie Riunite Alta Italia, literally "Northern Italy Combined Agents") is a symbol group cooperative society of food retailers that operates throughout Italy. CRAI was founded in 1973 and currently operates in Italy, Albania, Switzerland and Malta.

The history of CRAI begins in 1973, when a group of retailers decides to unify. Thus was born in Desenzano del Garda (province of Brescia) the "Commissionarie Riunite Alta Italia". Currently, most of the network is made up of medium-small size shops, mostly superettes, and are positioned in a patchy way on the Italian and foreign territory: in fact, the brand has also established itself in Albania, in Malta and Switzerland where there are around a hundred shops. After obtaining the certification of the brand, CRAI has also created a line of products distributed only in its own stores.

In 2016, CRAI achieved an aggregate turnover of € 5.8 billion and also introduced drug stores into the commercial network. These stores sell products related to personal and home care. In 2017 CRAI had a network of over 3,400 stores in Italy consisting of around 2,300 food stores and around 1,100 drug stores, and about a thousand entrepreneurs who own the supermarket sign. CRAI outlets are often located in urban centers. In the two-year period 2015–2016 CRAI recorded an expansion of 332 stores in the food and 293 in the drug sector. This growth leads CRAI to be among the ten supermarkets with the largest shares on Italian soil. In 2017 CRAI introduced online shopping for the sale of its products via e-commerce.

== See also ==
- List of supermarket chains
