= Jean-Louis Biget =

French historian (1937–2024)

- Born: 26 May 1937; Deux-Sèvres, France
- Died: 21 March 2024 (aged 86)
- Education: École normale supérieure de Saint-Cloud
- Occupation: Historian

Jean-Louis Biget (26 May 1937 – 21 March 2024) was a French historian who specialized in the Middle Ages.

== Biography ==
Born in Deux-Sèvres on 26 May 1937, Biget graduated from the École normale supérieure de Saint-Cloud in 1957. He became a professor at the École normale supérieure de Fontenay-Saint-Cloud and the École normale supérieure de Lyon. He specialized in the history of the medieval Languedoc region, notably the village of Albi. He also studied Catharism and other Christian heresies, works which were expanded on by the likes of R. I. Moore and Mark Gregory Pegg. He served as Secretary-General of the Comité historique de Fanjeaux and published in the scholarly journal Cahiers de Fanjeaux. In 1994, after the death of Marie-Humbert Vicaire, he was editor-in-chief of the journal until 2004. He was a member of the Goods Committee of the Episcopal City of Albi when it was designated as a UNESCO World Heritage Site in 2010.

Jean-Louis Biget died on 21 March 2024, at the age of 86.

== Publications ==
=== Articles ===
- "Un procès d’Inquisition à Albi en 1300" (1971)
- "Mythographie du catharisme" (1979)
- "L’évolution des noms de baptême en Languedoc au Moyen Âge (IXe-xive siècle)" (1982)
- "Autour de Bernard Délicieux : franciscanisme et société en Languedoc entre 1295 et 1330" (1984)
- "La cathédrale Sainte-Cécile d’Albi : l’architecture" (1985)
- "Les villes du Midi de la France au Moyen Âge" (1995)
- "Les 'Albigeois', histoire d'une dénomination" (1998)
- "Le Livre des sentences de l’inquisiteur Bernard Gui" (2005)
- "Béziers, citadelle de l'hérésie ?" (2010)
- "Jean Guiraud, historien du Moyen Âge, de l'hérésie et de l'Inquisition" (2014)

=== Books ===
- Histoire d’Albi (1983)
- Les cadastres anciens des villes et leur traitement par l'informatique : actes de la table ronde (1989)
- Sainte-Cécile d'Albi : peintures (1995)
- Sainte-Cécile d'Albi : sculptures (1997)
- La cathédrale Sainte-Cécile d'Albi : voir et comprendre (1998)
- Hérésie et inquisition dans le midi de la France (2007)
- Les cathares albigeois et "bons hommes" (2008)
- Eglise, dissidences et société dans l'Occitanie médiévale (2020)
- Albi et l'Albigeois au Moyen Âge (2022)

=== CD Albums ===
- Les Cathares
- L'Inquisition
- La grande peste noire
