= La Ghorfa stelae =

Series of ancient stelae from Tunisia

- Stelae preserved at the Bardo National Museum
- Type: Stelae
- Material: Limestone
- Height: 175–250 cm
- Period/culture: 1st–2nd centuries
- Discovered: 19th–20th centuries
- Place: Maghrawa
- Present location: British Museum; Louvre; Kunsthistorisches Museum; Bardo National Museum; Makthar Museum; Antiquarium of Dougga

The La Ghorfa stelae are a series of stelae dated to the 1st and 2nd centuries and discovered, for the most part, during the 19th century in Tunisia. They are distributed among various museums in Europe and North Africa.

According to specialists, these archaeological artifacts are ex-votos deposited by private individuals in a place of worship dedicated to the principal deity of Roman Africa, Ba'al Hammon, a sanctuary that has not been found.

They were discovered from the middle of the 19th century onwards, with the last of the series being found in the last third of the 20th century. Their precise provenance, namely Maghrawa, was clarified only in the penultimate decade of the 20th century through the work of the Tunisian historian and archaeologist Ahmed M'Charek. After the discovery of about forty archaeological pieces by a collaborator of the British consul in Tunis under poorly documented circumstances, the collection was quickly dispersed: part of it entered the collection of Muhammad Khaznadar and was then distributed among various locations, while another part remained in Tunisia before being dispersed again. The precise location was finally established through the in situ discovery of a final group of stelae during public works carried out at the end of the 1960s, these last discoveries being deposited at the archaeological site of Makthar.

These archaeological pieces, with their stereotyped form and very rich decorative motifs, are important for understanding the artistic and religious context. They may bear inscriptions in both Latin and Neo-Punic. They thus testify to intercultural links between the Phoenician–Punic substrate and Roman civilization, and to the context of cultural intermixing in Roman Africa.

== History ==
=== Ancient history ===
The stelae are dated to the end of the 1st century and the beginning of the 2nd century. They were erected in the Upper Tunisian Tell, between Makthar and Dougga, at the archaeological site of Maghrawa, 8 km north-west of Mactar, and in a mountainous region.

The ancient city covered about ten hectares according to Ahmed M'Charek. Two springs supplied the site with water, including Aïn-Maghrawa, approximately 300 m away. The site is very old, with megaliths datable to the 4th century BC, a sanctuary to Ba'al Hammon, and a wall that was probably Numidian. The site yielded Neo-Punic stelae dated to the 1st century. A monumental mausoleum dated to the end of the 2nd century was also present at the site, its inscription having been collected in the 19th century. The peregrine city in the 1st century had an organization and was equipped with dignitaries, including rabs, and an eponymous office. It belonged to the pagus Thuscæ, which surrounded Mactar, and comprised about fifty cities during the first two centuries of the Common Era.

The sanctuary that housed the stelae was unknown at the beginning of the 1990s. The oldest stelae are dated to the second half of the 1st century. They are ex-votos deposited by private individuals.

=== Recent history ===
The archaeological site of Macota served for a long time as a quarry and was much visited during the 19th century. Many ancient elements were reused as spolia in the houses of the village.

==== Recovered stelae ====
The stelae were discovered in part in 1842 by a German architect, Filippo Basiola Honegger. Others were brought to light between 1860 and 1873, these discoveries were published in 1896. This collection was distributed among the principal major museums that contain the known corpus; it comprises about forty archaeological pieces in total.

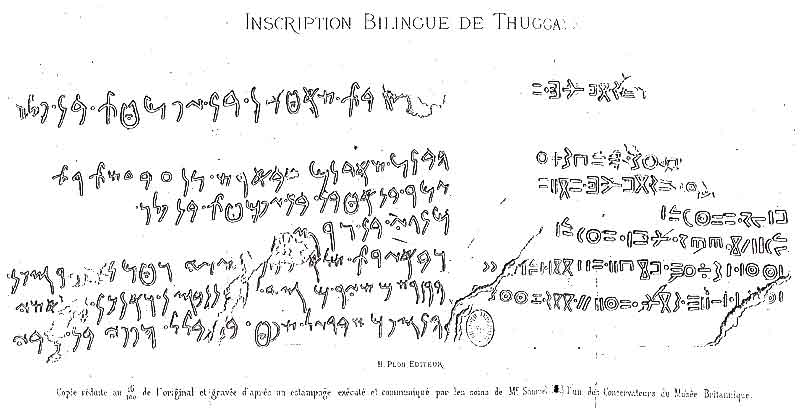
Drawing of a bilingual inscription from Dougga, originating from the Libyco-Punic mausoleum.

Filippo Basiola Honegger was a collaborator of Thomas Reade, the British consul in Tunis; in 1842 he collected for him the Punic-Libyan bilinguals from the Libyco-Punic Mausoleum of Dougga, not without seriously damaging the building, which was restored by anastylosis by Louis Poinsot at the beginning of the 20th century, before being sent to the British Museum. In the same year, he carried out research at Maghrawa, a correspondence long ignored by archaeologists, with the archaeological pieces being purchased by the consul. Honegger remained in Tunis and died before 1850, leaving stelae in various places, either at the places of discovery or with Tunisians. The chaplain of the Chapelle Saint-Louis de Carthage, Abbé François Bourgade, mentioned his work in 1852 in his book, The Golden Fleece of the Phoenician Language.

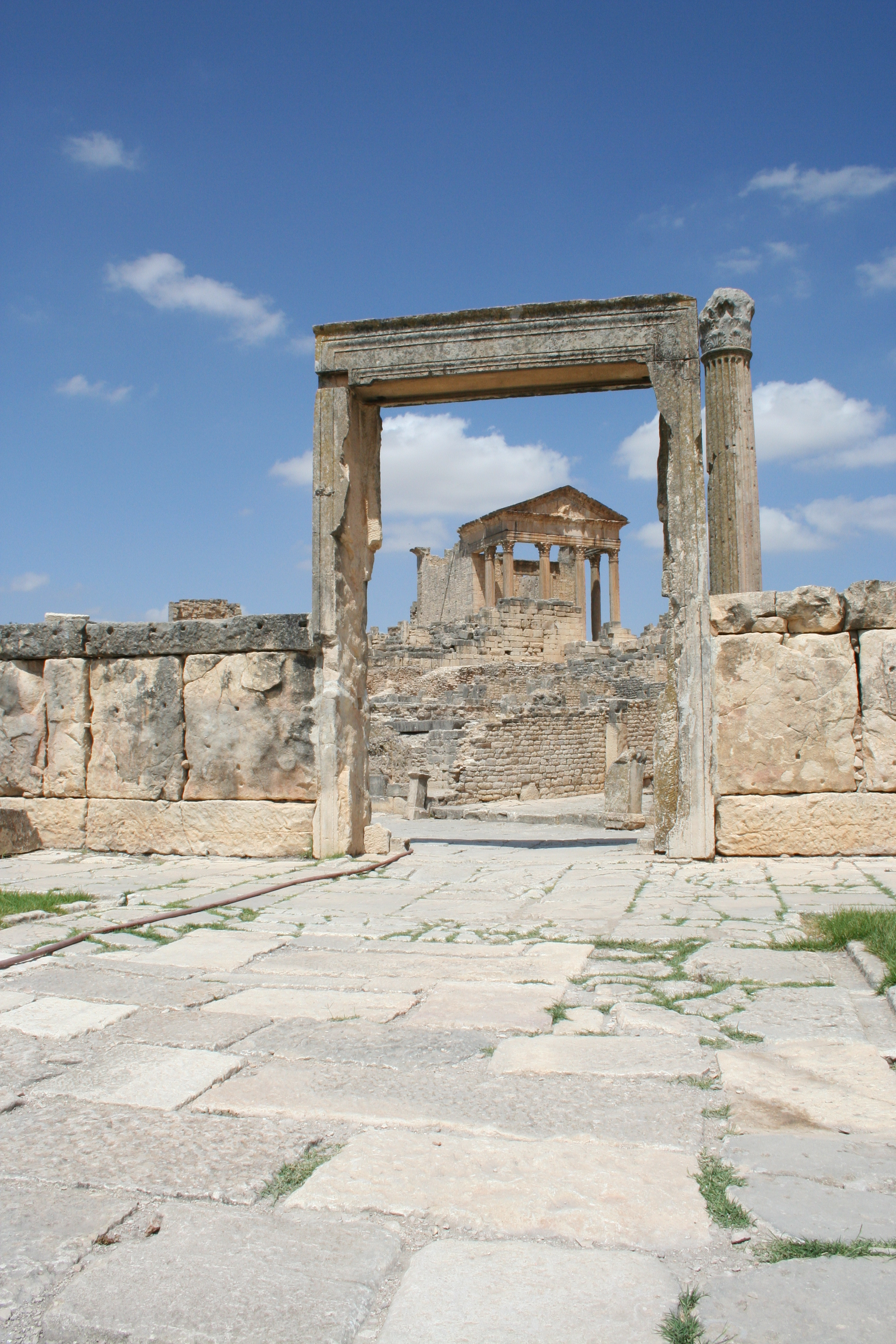
Element of the archaeological site of Dougga, the building known as Dar Lacheb, which for a time housed a reused stela.

Nathan Davis partially recovered the Honegger collection, sold eighteen stelae to Muhammad Khaznadar, and sent twenty-one to London between 1850 and 1860. At the same time, Abbé Bourgade purchased part of the Honegger collection in 1852. Some stelae remained in Tunis for ten to fifteen years, perhaps at Dougga in the case of the largest ones. The stelae were left there because of the poor condition of the tracks. Bourgade's stelae were sold after his death in 1866. Jean-Baptiste Evariste Charles Pricot de Sainte-Marie referred to a sale to a Greek and the loss of stelae, except for two pieces preserved at the Bardo National Museum, while other pieces entered the British Museum. At least three stelae were sent by Muhammad Khaznadar to Vienna for the Exposition Universelle of 1873; these stelae did not return to Tunisia because Khaznadar opposed this after the fall of his father Mustapha Khaznadar, owing to the confiscation of his property. The stelae then present in Vienna were deposited at the imperial museum.

Four of the stelae preserved at the British Museum bear inscriptions. Pricot de Sainte-Marie requested two stelae from La Manouba for the Louvre. In 1882, René Cagnat had twelve monuments placed in the gardens of the general residence, which were moved to the new Alaoui Museum, now the Bardo National Museum, in 1885.

==== Corpus ====
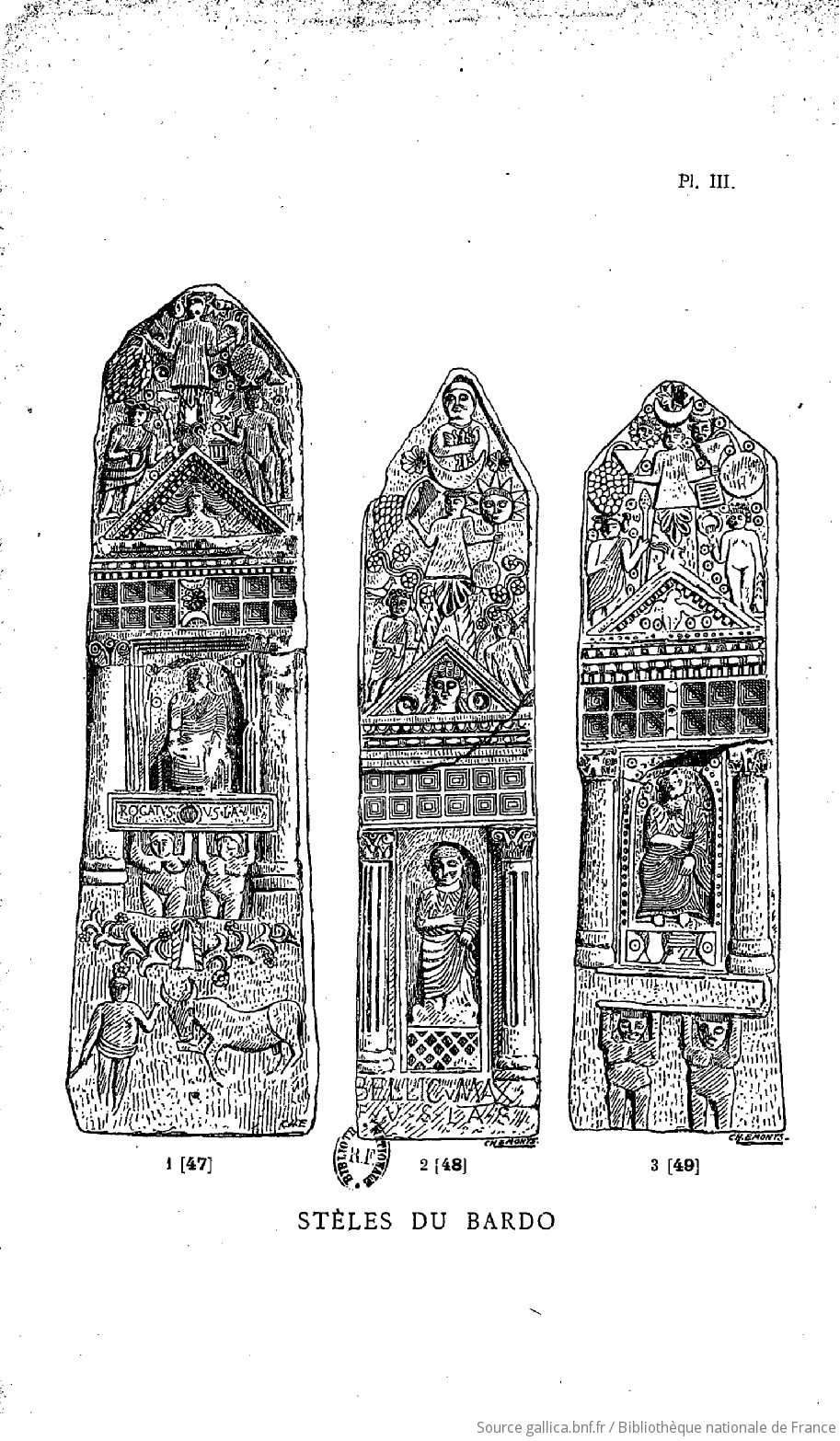
Plate showing the stelae preserved at the Bardo Museum in the Catalogue du musée Alaoui.

The series known to date comprises 44 pieces:

- 22 stelae are exhibited at the British Museum in London, (Note: Two are depicted in Lipinski (1992), p. 188.) (Note: Recorded by Anna Maria Bisi.) where they entered between 1850 and 1860.
- 2 are located in the Louvre, donated by Hayreddin Pasha, successor to Mustapha Khaznadar, and deposited in the museum in January 1876.
- 3 in the Kunsthistorisches Museum in Vienna since 1874.
- 17 in Tunisia:
  - 12 at the Bardo National Museum since 1884
  - 4 at the Makthar Museum
  - 1 at the Dougga antiquarium
  - 1 reused in a residential wall at Dougga, placed above the entrance door of Dar Lacheb.

The Bardo specimens came from a private collection, assembled in the 1870s at La Manouba by Muhammad Khaznadar, son of the minister Mustapha Khaznadar. Those of the Louvre and the Vienna Museum came from the same collection. The Institut du monde arabe in Paris preserves a stela from the series belonging to the Bardo National Museum.

The table below shows the full corpus, published by Jennifer Moore in 2000, excluding the four Maktar steles:

Moore ID	Current museum / inventory number	Inscription	Previous location	CIL 8 number
1	Bardo Cb-963		Alaoui C.745	
2	Bardo Cb-964		Alaoui C.748	
3	Bardo Cb-965		Alaoui C.744	
4	Bardo Cb-966		Alaoui C.743	
5	Bardo Cb-967		Alaoui C.746	
6	Bardo Cb-968		Alaoui C.747	
7	Bardo Cb-969		Alaoui C.749	
8	Bardo Cb-970		Alaoui C.750	
9	Bardo Cb-971		Alaoui C.751	
10	Bardo Cb-972		Alaoui C.752	
11	Bardo Cb-973	Rogatus V.S.L.A.	Alaoui C.741	CIL 8, 1144 and 14273
12	Bardo Cb-974	Bellic. Max. f. V.S.L.A.S.	Alaoui C.742	CIL 8, 1143 and 14272
13	British Museum WA 125021			
14	British Museum WA 125043			
15	British Museum WA 125062			
16	British Museum WA 125063			
17	British Museum WA 125066			
18	British Museum WA 125070			
19	British Museum WA 125072			
20	British Museum WA 125073			
21	British Museum WA 125075	L. Iuli Urba(ni)		CIL 8, 1145
22	British Museum WA 125076			
23	British Museum WA 125078			
24	British Museum WA 125098			
25	British Museum WA 125101			
26	British Museum WA 125102			
27	British Museum WA 125104			
28	British Museum WA 125174			
29	British Museum WA 125177	L’DN LB’L (neopunic)		
30	British Museum WA 125183	[ND]R 'Š N'D'R ŚM' QL' B'RK' (neopunic)		
31	British Museum WA 125184			
32	British Museum WA 125186			
33	British Museum WA 125189	R.V.S.L.H.		CIL 8, 1011
34	British Museum WA 125190			
35	British Museum WA 125192			
36	British Museum WA 125197			
37	?	V.S.L.M.	Dougga	CIL 8, 26513
38	Kunsthistorisches Museum I 350		Kaiserlichen Sammlung, no. 166	
39	Kunsthistorisches Museum I 351	V.S.L.A.F.	Kaiserlichen Sammlung, no. 168	
40	Kunsthistorisches Museum I 354		Kaiserlichen Sammlung, no. 178	
41	Louvre MNB 898			
42	Louvre MNB 899			
43	?	L.L.V.S.	Museum Mohammedanum	CIL 8, 1142 and p. 1384

=== Historiography and late identification ===
The Corpus Inscriptionum Latinarum (CIL) proposed the archaeological site of Carthage as the place of origin of some stelae. René du Coudray de La Blanchère studied the stelae of the Alaoui Museum in 1897 in a work published posthumously. He attributed them to the archaeological site of Dougga, with the Djebel Gorra being, in his view, the source of the confusion.

Louis Poinsot proposed that the stelae of the Louvre, the Bardo Museum, Vienna and Dar Lacheb belonged to the same corpus, and the hypothesis identifying their place of origin was made in 1905 based on the inventory of entries to the Louvre in 1876, which mentioned a "dubious provenance, La Ghorfa", a place located between Makthar and Dougga.

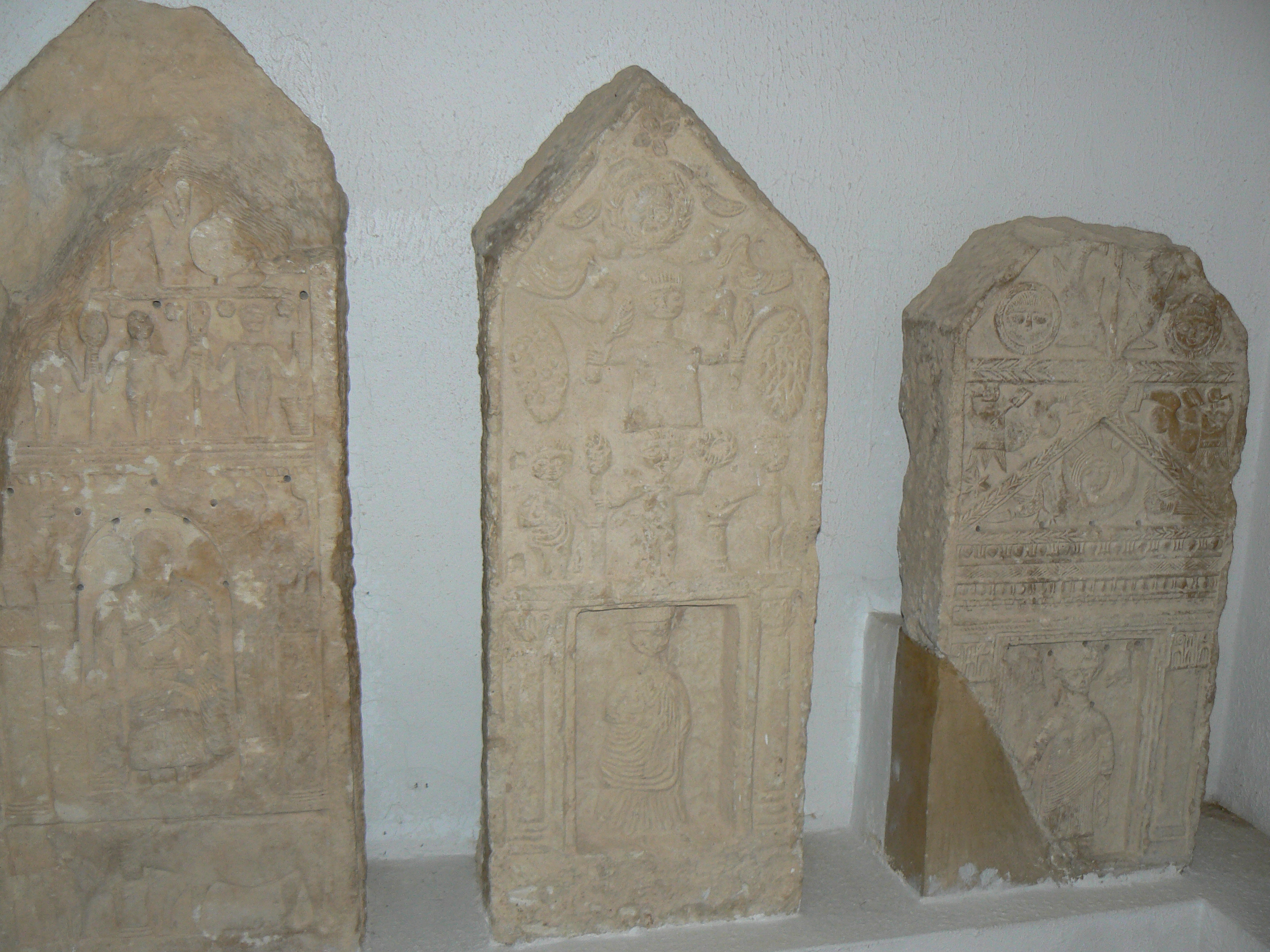
Three stelae located at the Makthar Archaeological Museum.

Louis Poinsot's cautious reservations were forgotten after him, with Gilbert Charles-Picard, Colette Picard, Mohamed Yacoub, Marcel Le Glay and Anna Maria Bisi maintaining the "established name" of La Ghorfa.

The last four stelae were found in 1967 at Aïn Maghrawa by workers from the water service and brought to the Makthar Museum: three were placed in a room, while the last remained not far from the civil basilica of Rutilius. Fragments of reliefs belonging to stelae were also identified in farmers' houses near the site by Ahmed M'Charek.

The stelae preserved at the British Museum were studied relatively little before the work of Anna Maria Bisi. Louis Poinsot studied two stelae from this group, catalogued in the CIL under numbers 1011 and 1145. In 1978, Bisi noted that only four of twenty-two stelae were exhibited, while the others were in storage. She was authorized to study the entire British corpus and to photograph it.

Ahmed M'Charek's research tended to demonstrate at the end of the 1980s that the stelae originated at the site of Maghrawa, in the region of Makthar. The inscriptions on the stelae received less attention than the reliefs and were studied at the end of the 1990s.

== Description ==
=== General characteristics ===
Front of a stela from the series lent by the Bardo National Museum and exhibited at the Institut du monde arabe in Paris in 2024.

The stelae were made with a chisel and in low relief. The reserve technique was used. The stone is grey Senonian limestone, more precisely Upper Senonian, which is widespread in the Makthar and Dougga region.

The stelae are rectangular with a triangular pediment. When complete, they are approximately 1.75 m high and sometimes contain dedications in Latin, or Punic. Some stelae in the corpus reach 2.5m in height.

Rear of the same stela, which has lost its lower register.

Eleven stelae bear an inscription, nine of them in Latin, with a similar formulation in all but one. One stela from the Bardo National Museum has a bilingual inscription. An inscription preserved at the British Museum is in boustrophedon. An inscription from the British Museum, WA 125189, bears the Latin inscription R.V.S.L.H, to be corrected to R.V.S.L.A (expanded as R(ogatus) v(otum) s(oluit) l(ibens) a(nimo)). This inscription preserved in England is recorded under the reference CIL VIII, 1011. An inscription on one of the stelae has been interpreted as having been made by a lapidary more familiar with the Punic language, which is written from right to left, than with Latin. Study of the British Museum corpus enabled Anna Maria Bisi to identify five different workshops, despite the coherence of the group.

Their form, that of a "flattened obelisk", is stereotyped, and they possess "a strong unity of style"; they have a triangular top and are divided into three superimposed registers, a "hierarchized representation of the cosmos".

=== Upper register ===
The Rogatus stela Cb-973, from the Bardo Museum, in a 19th-century engraving.

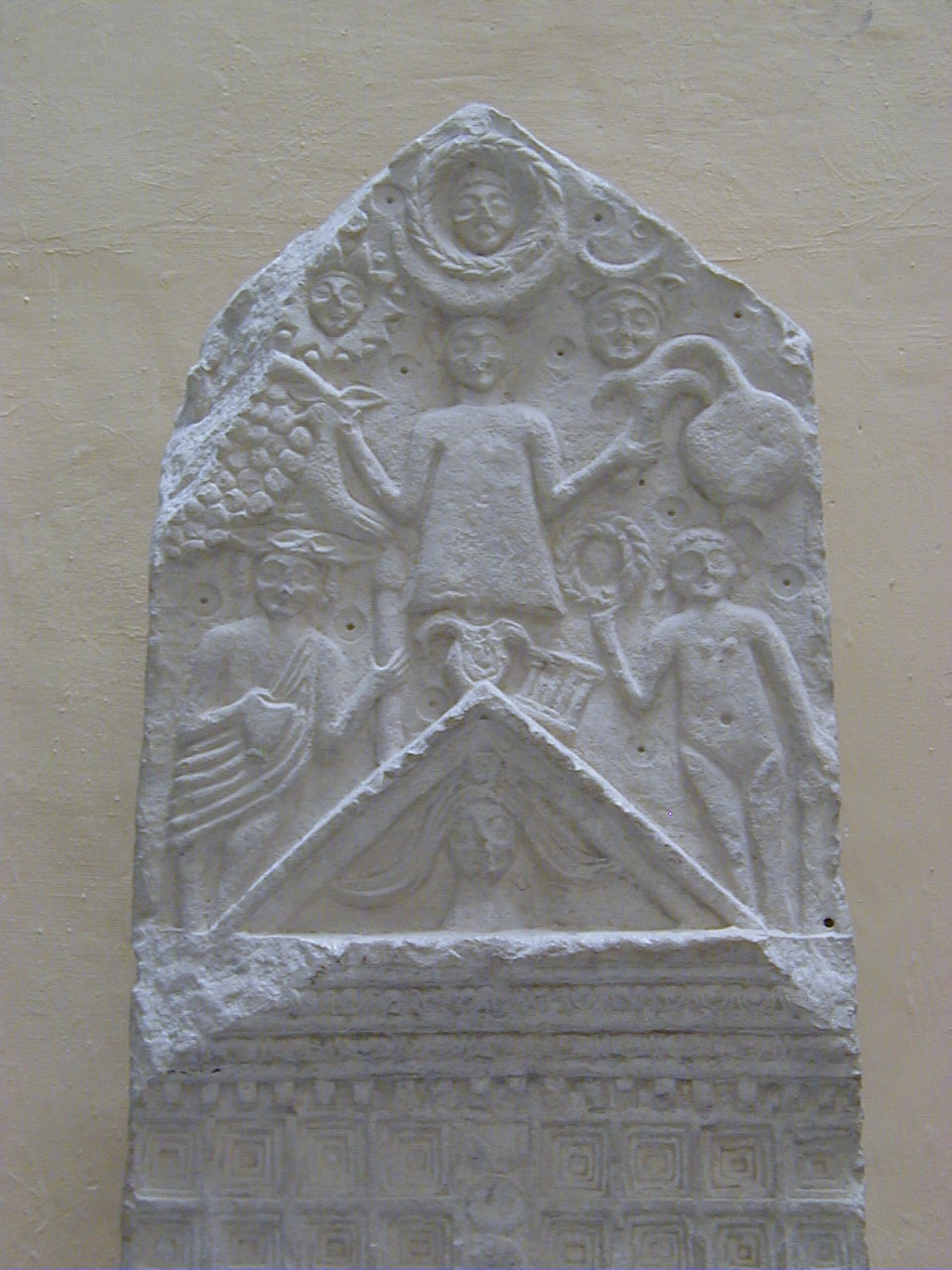
Upper register of one of the Bardo stelae with the divine and celestial world.

The upper register represents the divine world in human form. Astral symbols represent the Moon and the Sun, which is sometimes depicted with a face. The Tanit sign, sometimes in human form, is sometimes depicted with a procession of Roman deities including Mercury, Cupid or Venus, represented on the two sides of the pediment of the chapel depicting the dedicator. The central figure holds a cornucopia from which sheaves of wheat, grapes and pomegranates emerge. The deity Liber Pater is also represented. The pediment may also depict apotropaic motifs, as on Louvre stela MNB 898. Louvre stela MNB 899 features birds and rosettes.

One Bardo stela has an upper register divided into three parts, with two confronted dolphins, a Tanit sign with cornucopias, and Jupiter or Saturn on his throne with the thunderbolt and a pine cone on a pole, with the Dioscuri at his sides. The figures are placed in a very dense setting. Holes intended to receive metal inlays are also preserved. Mohamed Yacoub, who refers to stars, was preceded in this hypothesis by René du Coudray de La Blanchère..

=== Middle register ===
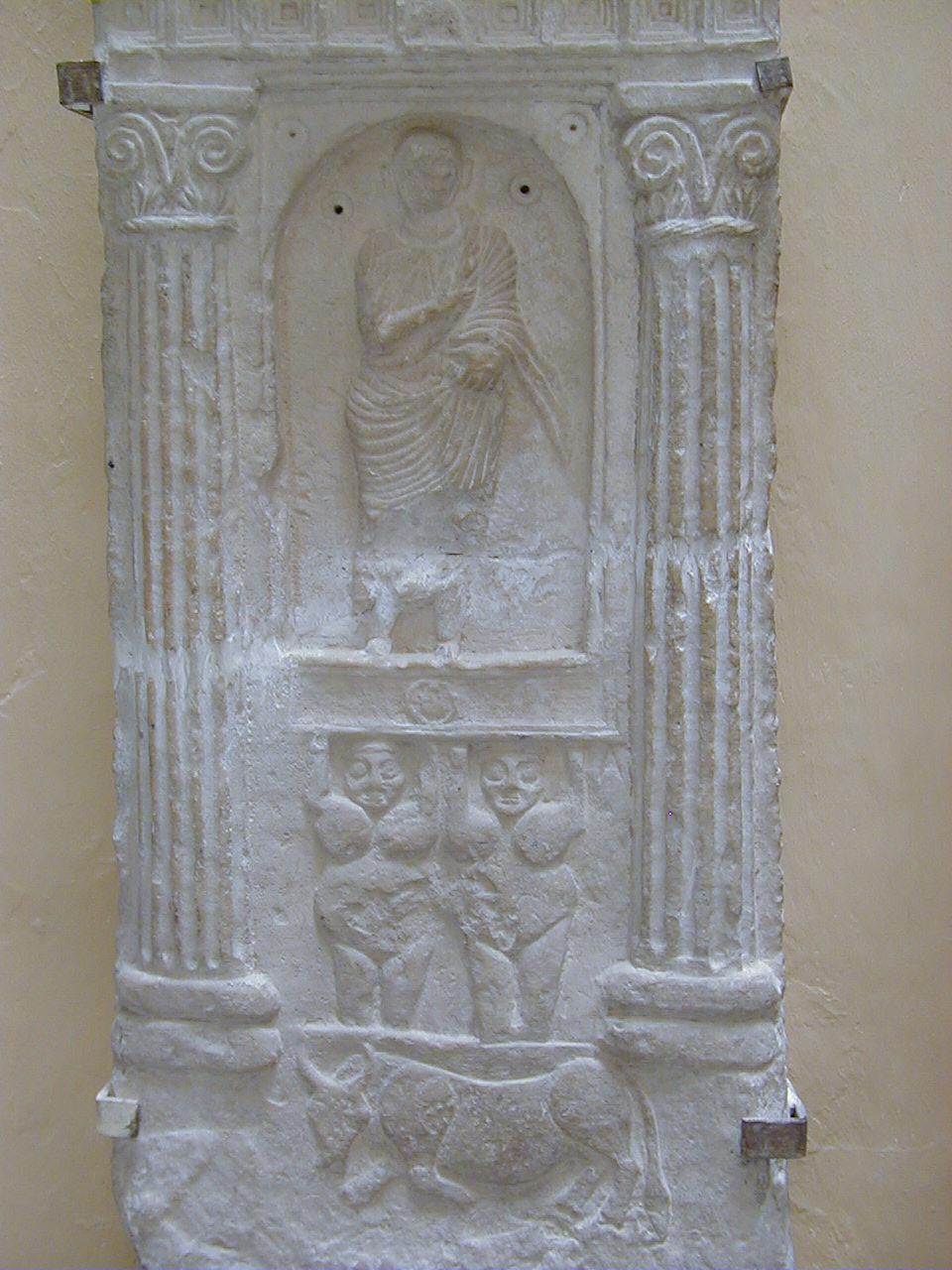
Middle and lower registers of a stela with a representation of the dedicator and the animal intended for sacrifice in the lower section.

The middle register is occupied by an element of Greco-Roman inspiration, with columns and a pediment of a building.

The dedicator is situated in the centre: he or she is standing in what appears to be a temple or chapel, with columns and a pediment. The dedicators may be men or women. They hold fruit in their hands. The men wear a toga or pallium, and the women wear dresses. The dedicators are not always dressed in Roman clothing.

One Bardo stela depicts a female dedicator with a burning altar. One of the stelae bears an inscription with the name Rogatus, of indigenous origin. The same stela bears a representation of the coffered ceiling of the building. The pediment of the temple bears either a deity, Tanit-Caelestis, or an eagle..

=== Lower register ===
Detail of a sacrificial scene on the lower part of one of the stelae preserved at the Bardo Museum, with a figure, a bovine and an altar.

The last register sometimes depicts Atlantes supporting the upper storey containing the chapel, sometimes accompanied by a scene of animal sacrifice, for which a bull is intended. The sacrificer is sometimes depicted, as on one of the stelae from the Bardo National Museum. The register also bears Hercules and the Nemean lion, or Hercules fighting the Lernaean Hydra. There may be a deity brandishing snakes.

The lower part of a stela preserved at the Louvre (MNB 898) contains two figures, one of whom carries a thyrsus and the other a crown. An animal intended for sacrifice is present, and two vegetal elements surround the motif. Stela MNB 899 features a representation of a coffered ceiling in its lower section.

== Interpretation ==
=== Popular art ===
African art experienced the influence of Greco-Roman art from the second half of the 1st century. The stelae were made according to popular taste with many decorative elements. Some architectural representations testify to the artisans' ignorance. The stelae possess an original character, with coherence and homogeneity in the chosen decoration.

=== Evidence of the persistence of Libyco-Punic religion ===
The stelae bear representations of the Sign of Tanit in human form and express a religious sentiment. They testify to the continuation of Libyco-Punic religion. Indigenous contributions are also notable.

=== Evidence of syncretism in Roman Africa ===
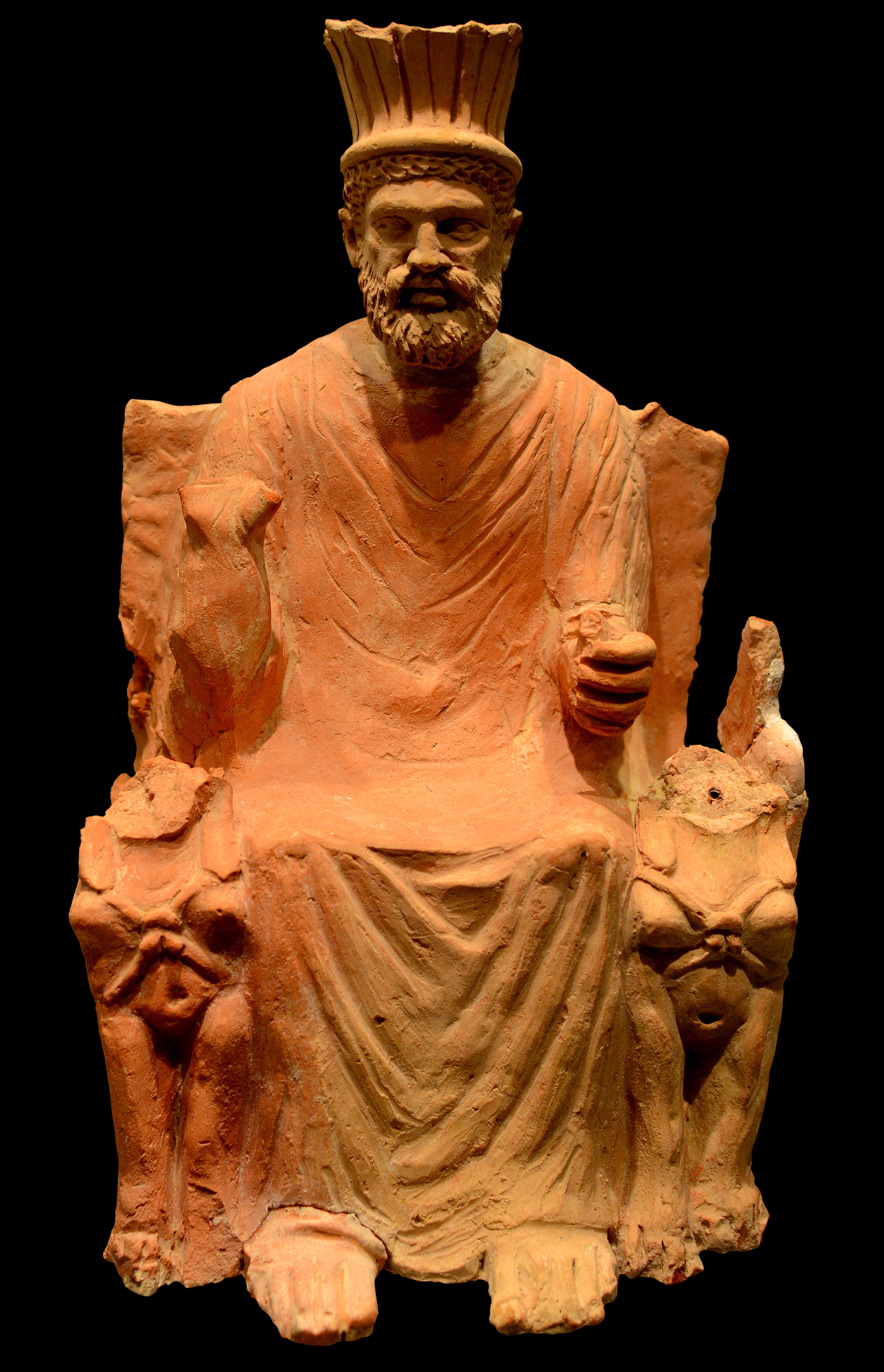
Statue of Baʿal Hammon on his throne with a crown and flanked by sphinxes, sanctuary of Thinissut, 1st century.

The representations of deities derive from Punic and Greco-Roman traditions. The stelae were dedicated by Latinized Africans to deities of the Punic and Roman pantheons, including Ba'al Hammon.

The Makthar region is renowned for the interaction among Numidian, Punic and Roman cultures, which contributed to the creation of the artifacts known as the La Ghorfa stelae. The stelae contain both Punic and Greco-Roman motifs, with local populations merging Punic and Roman imagery.

The stelae testify to the syncretism at work in Roman Africa, particularly in connection with Neoplatonism. Gilbert Charles-Picard regarded them as "works of art of powerful originality and the only testimony to Punic theological thought in Africa during the Roman Empire". Ultimately, the stelae constitute witnesses to the "intercultural links between the Phoenician–Punic substrate and Roman civilization".

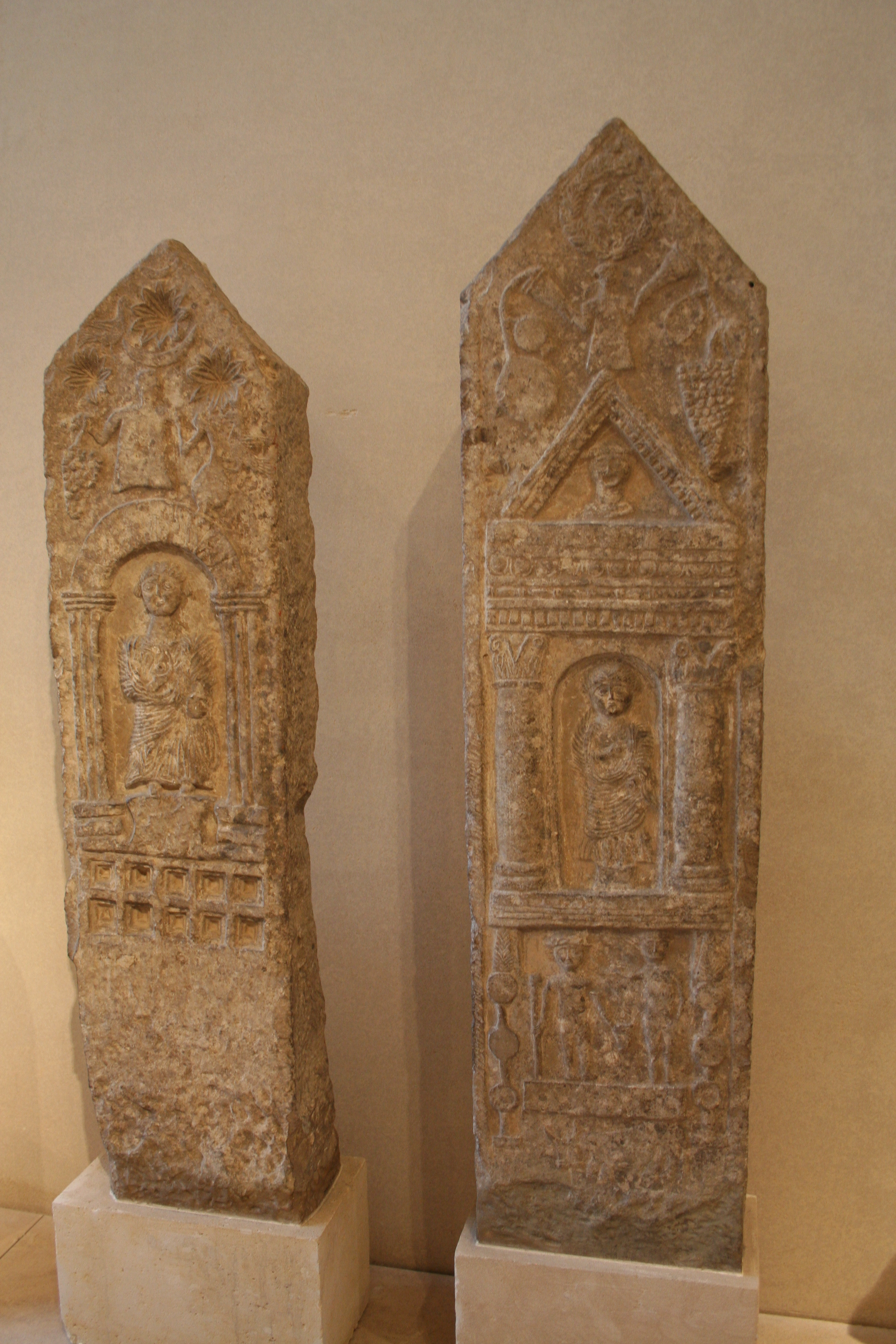
Stelae at the Louvre.

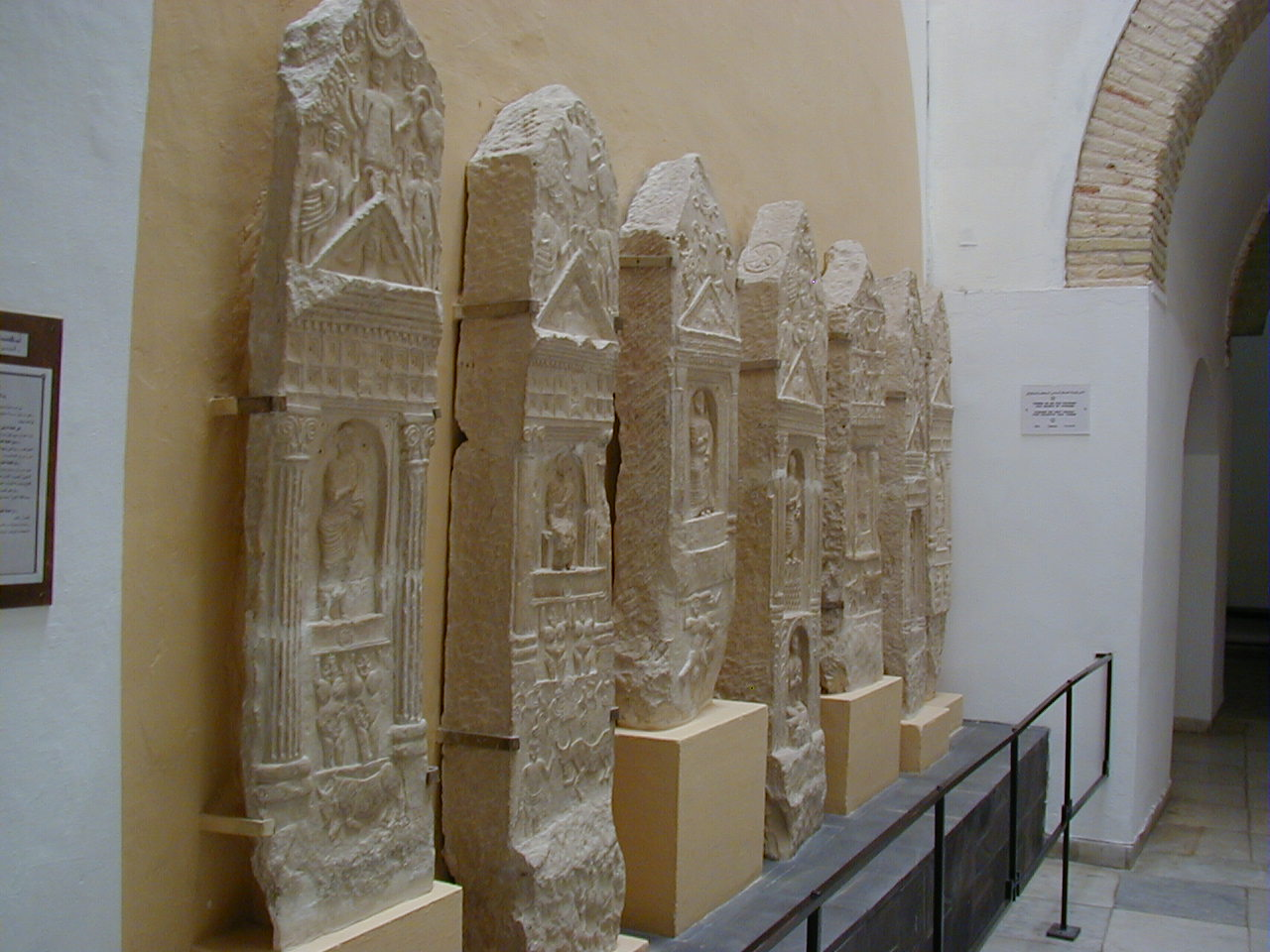
Another view of the series at the Bardo National Museum.

== Bibliography ==
=== Focused on La Ghorfa steles ===
- de La Blanchère, René du Coudray (1897). Tombes en mosaïque de Thabraca: douze stèles votives du musée du Bardo (in French). Ernest Leroux. pp. 31–56. ISSN 2105-2220.
- Poinssot, Louis (1905). "Les stèles de La Ghorfa". Bulletin archéologique du Comité des travaux historiques et scientifiques (in French): 395–405. ISSN 0071-8394.
- Bisi, Anna Maria (1978). "A proposito di alcune stele del tipo della Ghorfa al British Museum". Antiquités africaines (in Italian) (12): 21–88. ISSN 0066-4871.
- Ghedini, Elena Francesca (1990). "Ancora sulle stele della Ghorfa : quelque precisazione". L'Africa romana (in Italian) (VII): 233–244.
- M'Charek, Ahmed (1988). "Maghrāwa, lieu de provenance des stèles punico-numides dites de la Ghorfa". Mélanges de l'École française de Rome (in French). 100 (2): 731–760.
  - M'Charek, Ahmed (1997). "Maghrawa, antique Macota (Tunisie)". Antiquités africaines (in French) (33): 119–127. ISSN 0066-4871.
  - M'Charek, Ahmed (2010). "388: Macota / Maghrawa (Tunisie)". Encyclopédie berbère (in French). Vol. 30. pp. 4465–4468.
- Moore, Jennifer P. (1999). "Cultural elasticity in the inscriptions of the so-called « La Ghorfa » stelae". Antiquités africaines (35): 31–37. ISSN 0066-4871.
- Moore, Jennifer P. (2000). Cultural identity in Roman Africa: The 'La Ghorfa' stelae (PhD thesis). Interviewed by Dunbabin, Katherine. McMaster University. doi:10.71548/8020.

=== Wider sources ===
- Aounallah, Samir (2020). L'Antiquité tunisienne: de la fondation d'Utique à la prise de Carthage (in French). Tunis: Nirvana. p. 384. ISBN 978-9938530575.
- Fantar, M'hamed Hassine; Aounallah, Samir; Daoulatli, Abdelaziz (2015). Le Bardo, la grande histoire de la Tunisie: musée, sites et monuments (in French). Tunis: Alif. p. 244. ISBN 9789938958119.
- Fantar, M'hamed Hassine (1982). Fantar, M'hamed Hassine (ed.). De Carthage à Kairouan: 2000 ans d'art et d'histoire en Tunisie (in French). Paris: Agence française d'action artistique.
- Le Glay, Marcel (1961). Saturne africain: Monuments-I (in French). Paris. p. 464.
- Le Glay, Marcel (1966). Saturne africain: Monuments-II (in French). Paris. p. 366.
- Le Glay, Marcel (1966). Saturne africain: Histoire (in French). Paris: Befar. p. 522.
- Lipinski, Edward (1992). Lipinski, Edward (ed.). Dictionnaire de la civilisation phénicienne et punique (in French). Turnhout: Brepols. ISBN 2503500331.
- Slim, Hédi; Mahjoubi, Ammar; Belkhodja, Khaled; Ennabli, Abdelmajid (2003). Histoire générale de la Tunisie (in French). Vol. I. Paris: Maisonneuve et Larose. ISBN 978-2-7068-1695-6.
- Yacoub, Mohamed (1993). Le Musée du Bardo: départements antiques (in French). Tunis: Agence nationale du patrimoine. p. 294. ISBN 978-9973-917-12-6.
- Charles-Picard, Gilbert (1983). "La recherche archéologique en Tunisie des origines à l'Indépendance". Cahiers des études anciennes. 16: 11–20. ISSN 0317-5065.
- Dussaud, René (1957). "C. Gilbert Picard—Catalogue du musée Alaoui". Syria. 34 (1–2): 181–182. ISSN 0039-7946.
- Ouertani, Nayla (1994). "La sculpture romaine". La Tunisie: carrefour du monde antique. Les dossiers d'archéologie. Dijon: Éditions Faton. p. 97. ISBN 978-2878440201.
- Ben Abed, Aïcha (1992). Le musée du Bardo: une visite guidée. Tunis: Cérès. p. 76. ISBN 978-9973700834.
- Piganiol, André (1957). "Sur la source du Songe de Scipion". Comptes rendus des séances de l'Académie des inscriptions et belles-lettres (in French). 101 (1): 88–94.
