= Roman Africa =

History of northern Africa under Roman rule

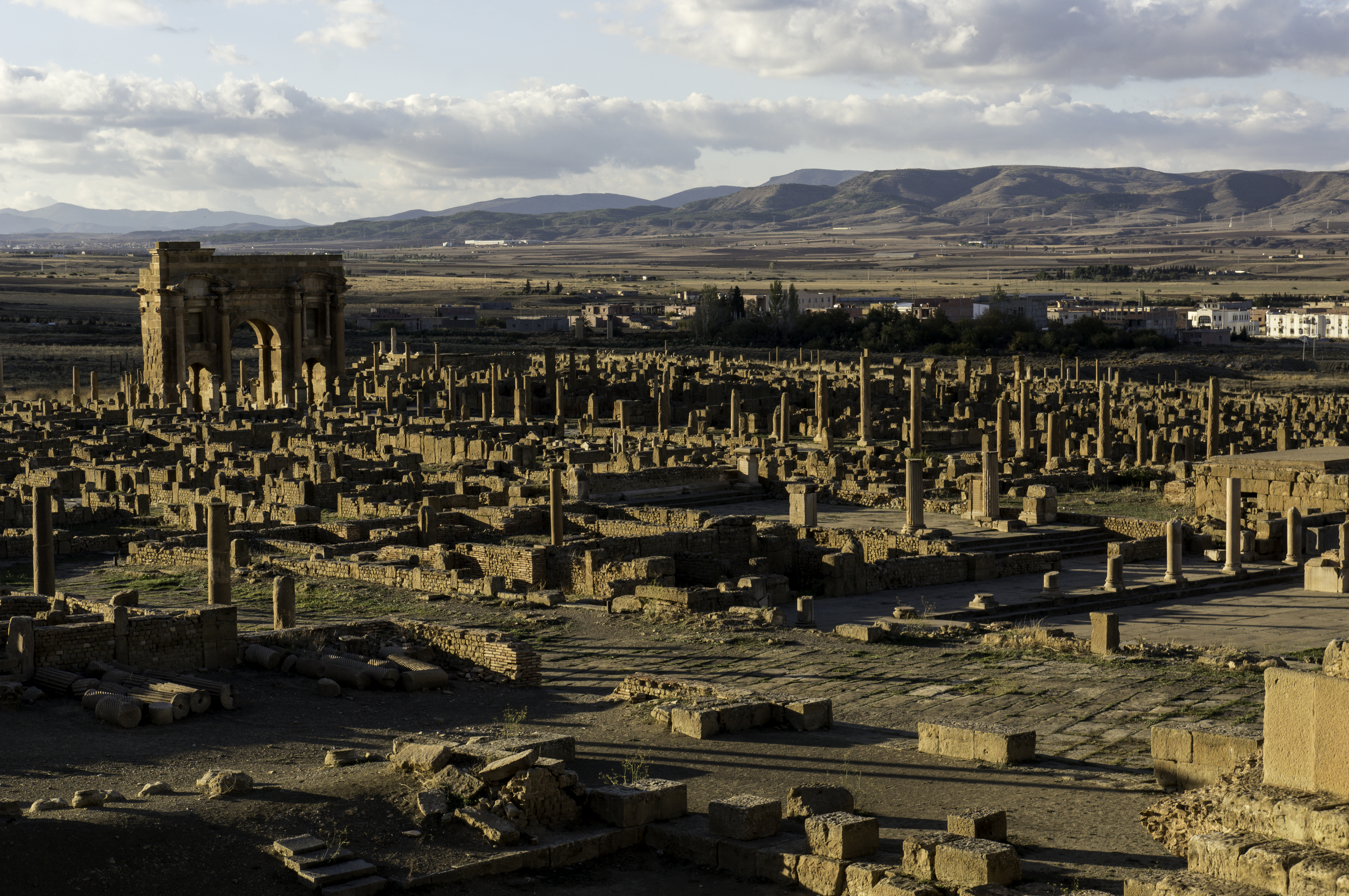
The ruins of Timgad in present-day Algeria, founded as a colonia under the emperor Trajan

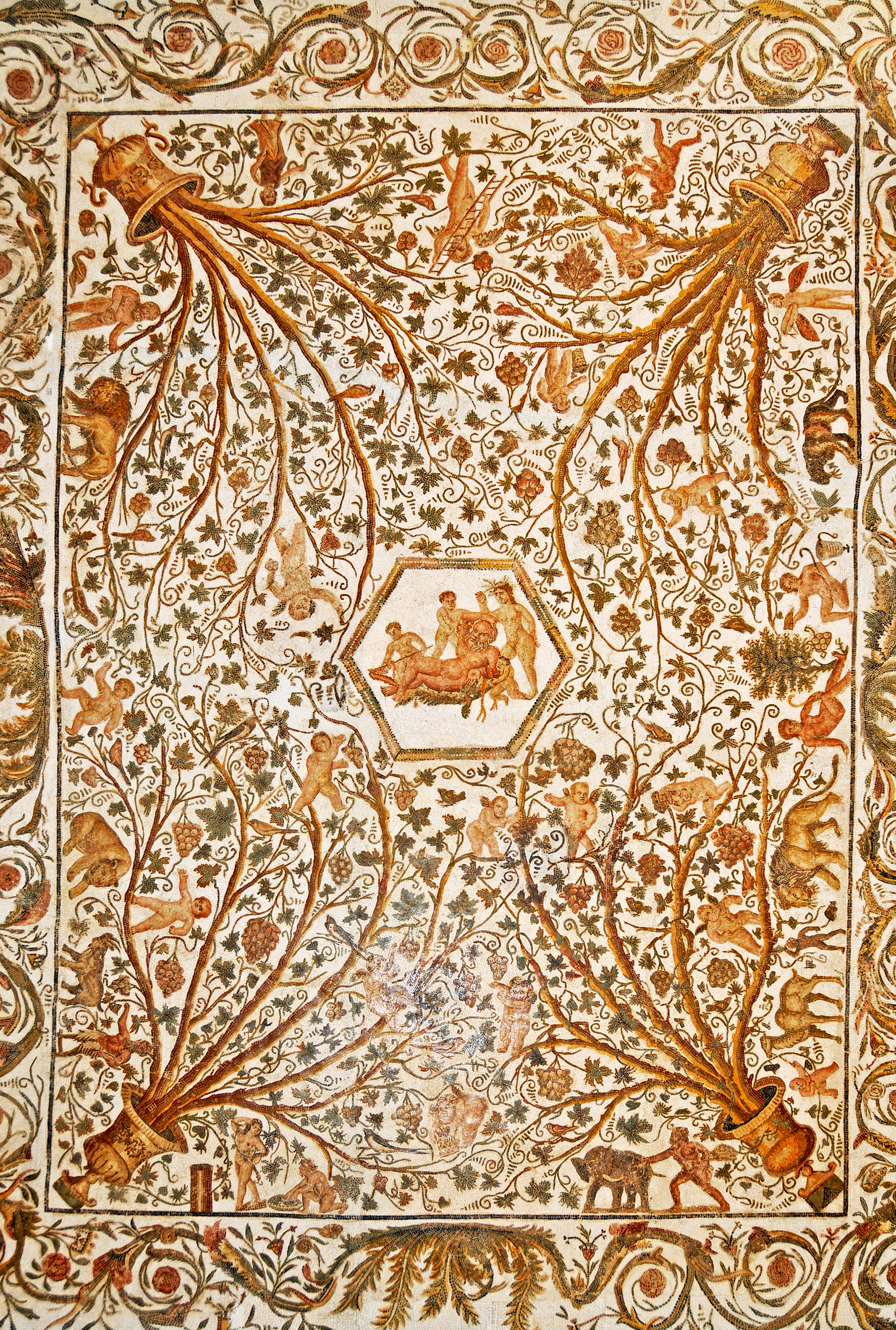
Mosaic from El Djem, Tunisia

Roman Africa or Roman North Africa is the culture of Roman Africans that developed from 146 BC, when the Roman Republic defeated Carthage and the Punic Wars ended, with subsequent institution of Roman Imperial government, through the 5th and 6th centuries AD under Byzantine Imperial control. In referring to "Africa", the Romans themselves meant Africa Proconsularis, with Roman Egypt a separate province having a distinct Greco-Egyptian culture and society, and Aethiopia representing the largely unknown bounds of sub-Saharan Africa. The loose geography of "Roman Africa" encompasses primarily present-day Tunisia, Algeria, Libya, and northern Morocco.

== Government ==
The Roman Imperial and later the Byzantine presence manifested in a series of evolving but defined administrative provinces. In the late Republic (starting in the mid-2nd century BC) through the Principate and the Crisis of the Third Century, these were:

- the original province of Africa, organized around the metropolis of Carthage under the first Roman governor of Africa, Scipio Aemilianus;
- from 25 BC, Africa Proconsularis, from which the province of Numidia (northeastern Algeria) was detached;
- Mauretania, colonized under the first Roman emperor, Augustus, and annexed as a province under Claudius in AD 44, from which the provinces Mauretania Tingitana (in northern Morocco) and Mauretania Caesariensis (in Algeria) were created and retained until the Vandal conquest in AD 429;
- Tripolitania (Libya) and Africa Byzacena (Tunisia), subdivided from proconsular Africa (thereafter also known as Africa Zeugitana) under the emperor Diocletian.

After Diocletian's formation of the Tetrarchy, the Diocese of Africa was the overarching imperial administration of North Africa, excluding Mauretania Tingitana.

Byzantine North Africa (AD 533 through ca. 698/700) was governed as:

- Praetorian prefecture of Africa (AD 534–591);
- Exarchate of Africa (AD 591–698).

== Culture ==
North Africa is particularly known for the abundance and quality of its Roman-era mosaics and for its influence on the intellectual development of Christianity in late antiquity through theologians such as Tertullian, Cyprian, and Augustine of Hippo.

== See also ==
- North Africa during classical antiquity
- Roman roads in Africa
- Fossatum Africae
- Makthar (archaeological site)
  - Makthar Museum

== Sources ==
- Cilliers, Louise (2019). Roman North Africa: Environment, Society and Medical Contribution. Amsterdam University Press.
- Cherry, David (1998). Frontier and Society in Roman North Africa. Clarendon.
- Clark, Elizabeth A.; Smith, Zachary B., eds. (2024). Colors and Textures of Roman North Africa: Essays in Memory of Maureen A. Tilley. Catholic University of America.
- Conant, Jonathan (2012). Staying Roman: Conquest and Identity in Africa and the Mediterranean, 439–700. Cambridge Studies in Medieval Life and Thought. Vol. 4. Cambridge University Press.

=== Religion ===
- Burns, J. Patout; Jenson, Robin M., eds. (2014). Christianity in Roman Africa: The Development of Its Practices and Beliefs. Eerdmans.
- Frend, W. H. C. (1952). The Donatist Church: A Movement of Protest in Roman North Africa. University of Michigan Press.
- Gaumer, Matthew Alan (2016). Augustine's Cyprian: Authority in Roman Africa. Brill.
- Lander, Shira L. (2016). Ritual Sites and Religious Rivalries in Late Roman North Africa. Cambridge University Press.

=== Mosaics ===
- Dunbabin, Katherine M. D. (1978). The Mosaics of Roman North Africa: Studies in Iconography and Patronage. Clarendon.
- Abed, Aïcha Ben, ed. (2006). Stories in Stone: Conserving Mosaics of Roman Africa. Masterpieces from the National Museums of Tunisia. J. Paul Getty Museum. ISBN 978-0-89236-803-7.
