= Anna Maria Bisi =

Italian archaeologist

- Born: 1938
- Died: 1988 or 1990
- Occupation: Archaeologist
- Known for: Phoenicians and Punics studies

Anna Maria Bisi (1938–1988 or January 1990), known as A. M. Bisi, was an Italian archaeologist and academic, specialising in the Phoenicians and Punics.

== Life ==
Bisi had a single minded career. A student of Sabastino Moscati, she obtained her doctorate and published "Il grifone: dalle origini orientali al VI secolo a.C." (The Griffin: from its eastern origins to the 6th century BC.) in 1965. Two years later she published "Le Stele puniche (Punic Stelae)," again in "Studi Semitici" (Semitic Studies) but this time on Punic archaeology.

By the time she was 30 years old, Bisi had been named "Inspector of Oriental Antiquities at the Superintendency of Antiquities of the City of Palermo" while she continued her active research. According to Dolce, the academic scholarship and numerous publications she derived from that position had profound influences.

It should not be forgotten that A. M. Bisi's professional work at the Superintendency immediately produced one important result, sometimes neglected even today, relating to the primary study of those who take on and exercise authority to control and provide information in the fields of culture and the dissemination of knowledge in general: the duty to promptly report even partial information on excavation and research activities. It was in this period that she published papers in "Notizie degli Scavi" between 1966 and 1970, in Bollettino d'Arte in 1968, in Sicilia Archeologica, Annali dell'Istituto Orientale di Napoli (AION) in 1969, and Libya antiqua, in the years 1969-1970.

Bisi was made Professor of Punic Antiquities at the Sapienza University of Rome in 1969, and Professor of the Archaeology of the Ancient Near East at the University of Urbino in 1971. Her research focused on artisanal handicrafts and iconography, through which she studied the spread of Phoenician culture and cultural relations throughout the Mediterranean.

According to Dolce, Bisi died suddenly in January 1990.

== Selected works ==
- Moscati, Sabatino; Bisi, Anna Maria (1989). Storia universale dell'arte (in Italian). Torino: UTET. ISBN 978-8802042381.
- Bisi, Anna Maria (1990). Le terrecotte figurate fenicie e puniche in Italia (in Italian). Rome: Libreria dello Stato, Istituto poligrafico e Zecca dello Stato. ISBN 978-8824001106.
