= Makthar Museum =

Tunisian museum inaugurated in 1967

Makthar museum
- Musée de Makthar
- Location within Tunisia
- Established: 1967
- Location: Makthar
- Coordinates: 35°51′22″N 9°12′23″E
- Collections: Punique Romaine Paléo-chrétienne et byzantine

The Makthar Museum is a small Tunisian museum, inaugurated in 1967, located on the Makthar Archaeological Site, the ancient Mactaris. Initially a simple site museum using a building constructed to serve as a café on the site of a marabout, it comprises three rooms, some of which are displayed outside in a lapidary garden. Additionally, just behind the museum are the remains of a basilica.

The collection, primarily consisting of items found during excavations conducted on the site or in its immediate vicinity, is representative of the history of Tunisia from the Punic-Numidian period to the end of the Ancient history, including traces of Christianity in the Byzantine era.

== Punic and Neo-punic items ==
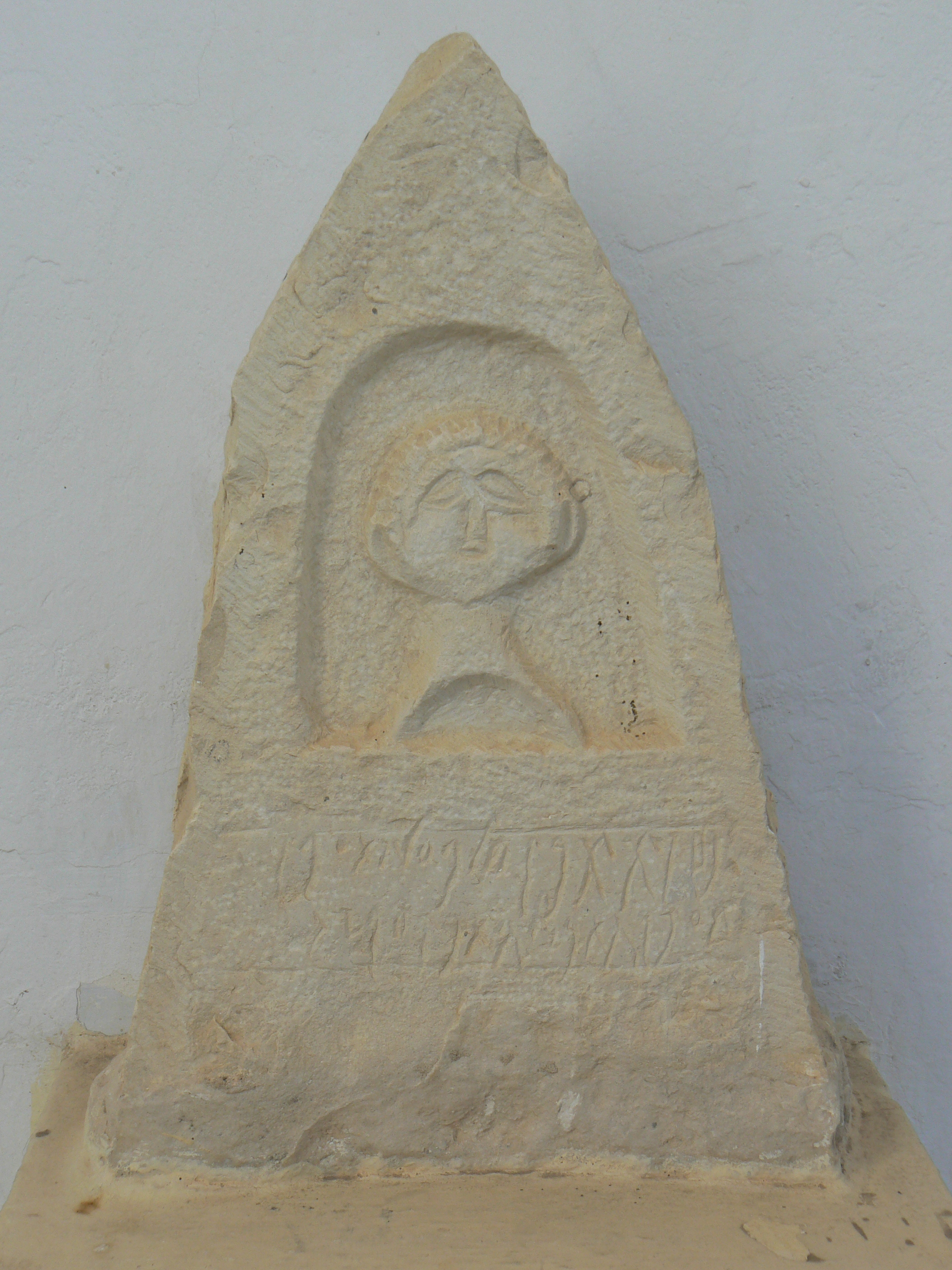
Libyan-Punic stele with naive sculpture bust and inscription.

The site did not yield any remains from the earliest Phoenician settlement in North Africa. However, the Punic or Neo-Punic collections, representing Punic civilization but dating from a period after the destruction of Carthage during the Third Punic War, are particularly interesting.

They consist mainly of Punic and Neo-Punic ex-votos and funerary stelae, sometimes bearing inscriptions in Libyco-Punic and Neo-Punic characters. Some also feature symbolic representations of the deceased, albeit with a relatively naive or schematic treatment.

These discoveries allow the understanding of the relationship between the Punics and the indigenous populations, as well as the "Punicization" of the latter, even in a period after the destruction of the great African city. Punic cultural codes continue to spread, some persisting particularly in the religious or even political spheres. Architectural items are also found in this section of the museum.

== Roman items ==
The Roman-era items are quite diverse, including funerary furniture as well as life-related artifacts, particularly the daily life, of the small city.

Architectural items are displayed outside the museum, including the pediment of a funerary monument belonging to priestesses of Ceres. Additionally, there are statue bases and altars. Among the objects of daily life, a showcase presents a collection of oil lamps from various periods, coins, ceramics, and also a display of ancient glassware.

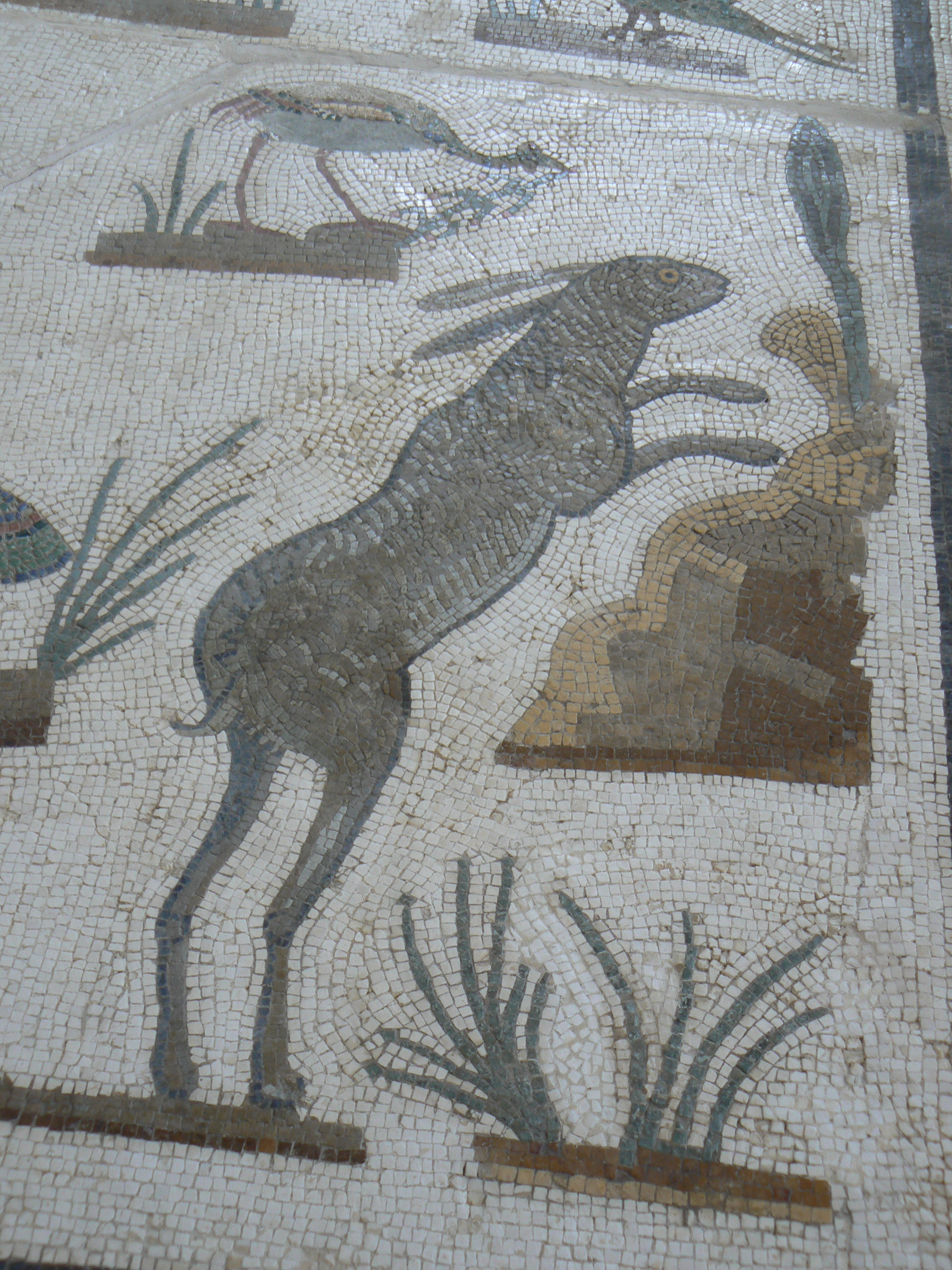
Detail of animal mosaic (leaping hare).

Pagan mosaics are displayed, including a large mosaic adorned with numerous animal motifs (birds and game). This theme is widespread in African mosaics from this period. Another mosaic depicts Venus bathing, the deity undressing, leaning against a tree, and surrounded by two cherubs bringing her flowers. The work is remarkable for its light and shadow play. There are also fragments of sculptures, especially heads of emperors or deities, showing degradation signs. A lion, dating back to the 1st century and belonging to an older Numidian-Punic tradition, is visible, although a better-preserved specimen is located in the Bardo National Museum.

The four steles known as the "La Ghorfa stelae", discovered not far from Makthar in 1967, at Maghrawa (ancient Macota), are the latest in a significant series. The first ones were found in the mid-19th century, and their provenance was poorly understood until the work of Ahmed M'Charek. They have allowed the study of religious rites and beliefs in Roman Africa and the determination of the importance of the Libyan-Punic substrate. These discoveries follow stereotyped forms, organized in superimposed registers depicting the divine world, a depicted dedication in the middle of a temple pediment, and a sacrifice representation in its lower part. More generally, the texts provided by the site are very interesting for the knowledge of ancient Africa: the onomastics appearing in the exhibited works concern names of individuals belonging to a local population undergoing Romanization.

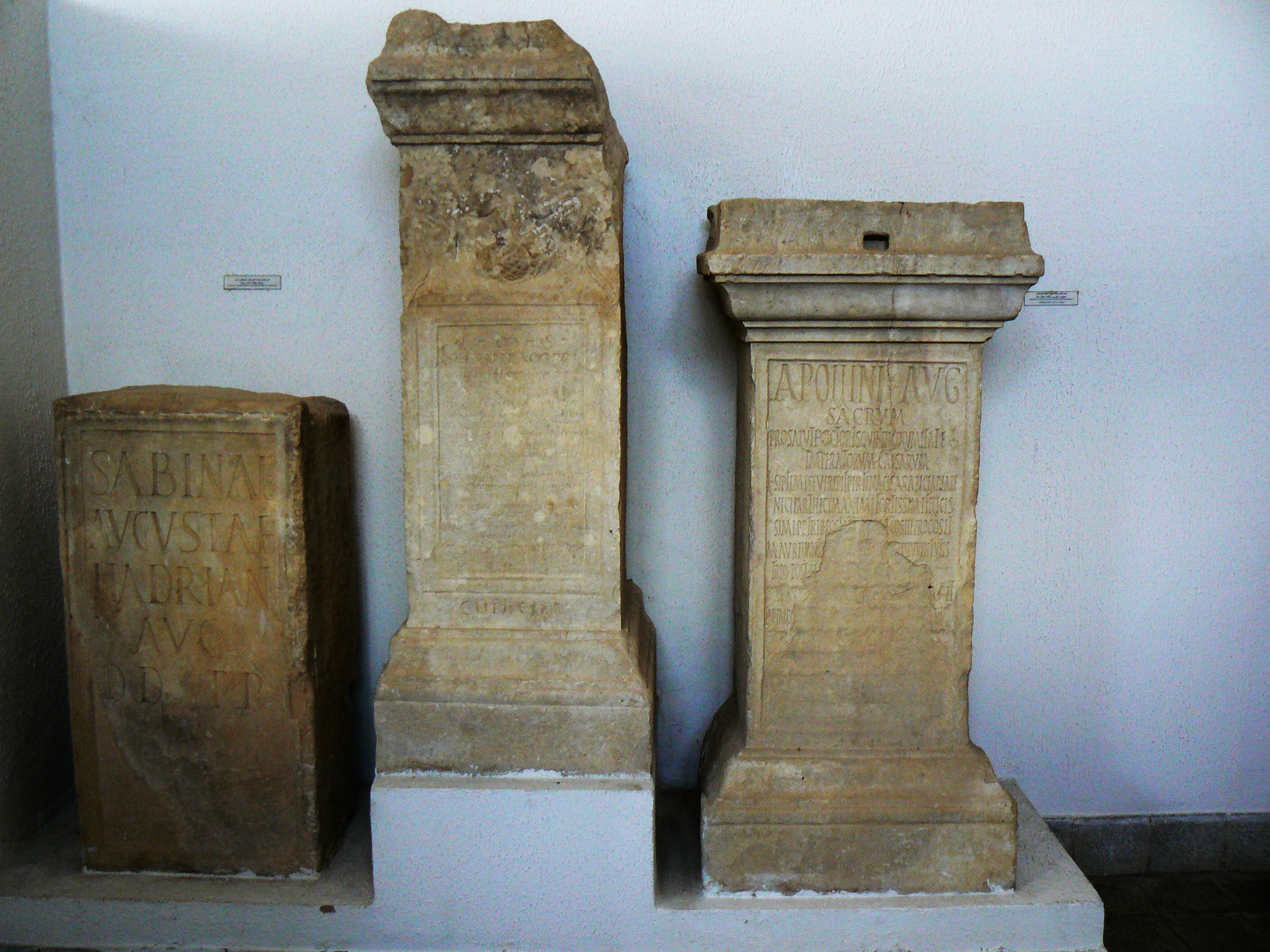
Statue bases, including Beccut cippus in the middle.

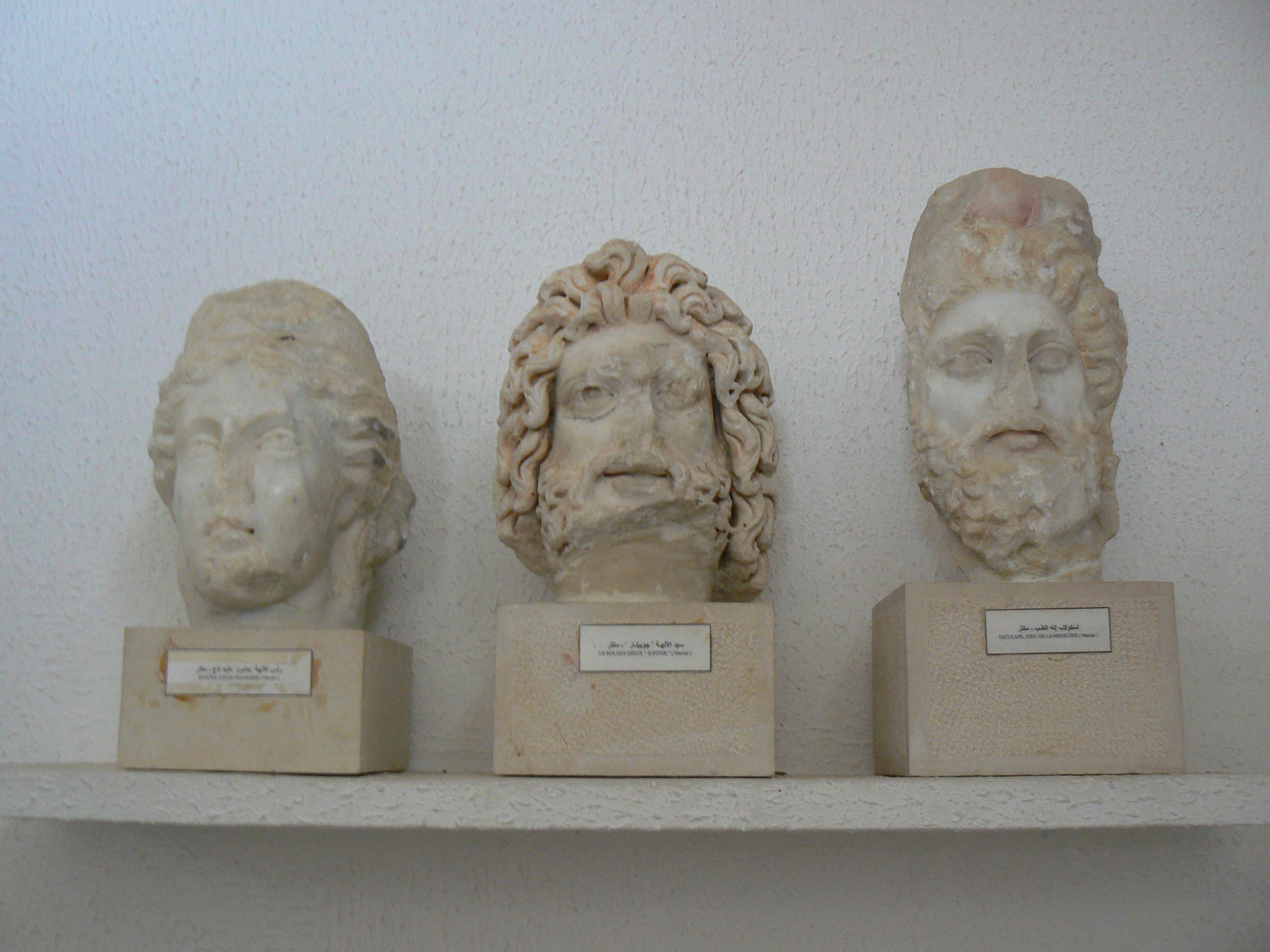
Emperors and Aesculapius heads.

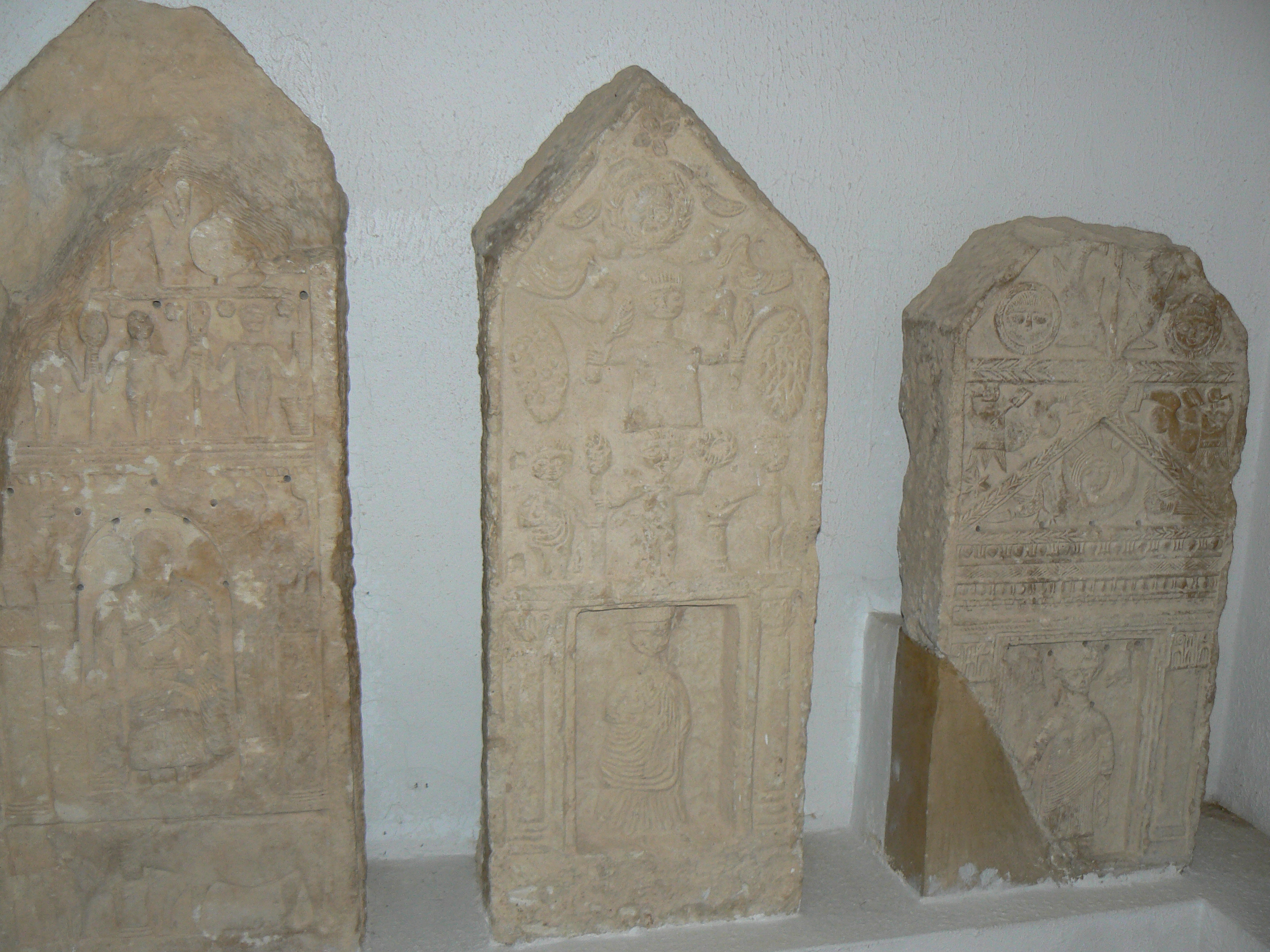
La Ghorfa stelae

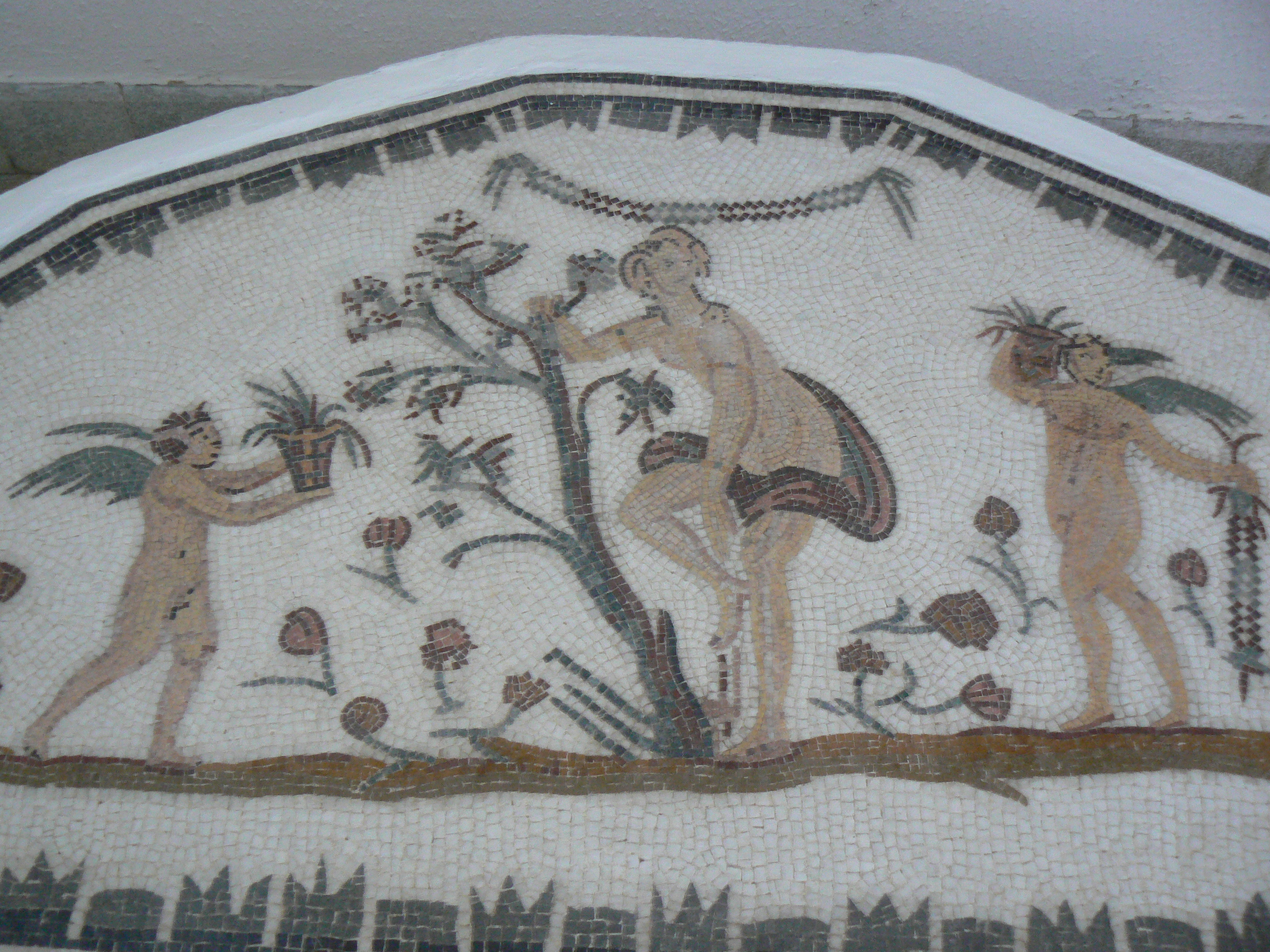
Vénus au bain (Venus bathing).

== Paleochristian and Byzantine items ==
The finds on display in this department of the museum bear witness to the Christianity establishment in the region.

The Paleochristian and Byzantine period is represented by marble fragments from gravestones of Christian tombs, some of which feature delicate incised decorations. The museum also includes fine examples of epitaphs from the same period, discovered in large numbers at the site.

The museum also houses beautiful Christian mosaics, especially funerary ones, some of which feature a Chi-Rho symbol; some adorned double tombs.

At the back of the museum are the remains of the so-called "Rutilius" basilica, which have been the subject of studies, particularly by Noël Duval. The construction, which took over the site of a sanctuary dedicated to Saturn, may have been the city's cathedral and has suffered greatly from the excavations carried out on the site since the mid-19th century.

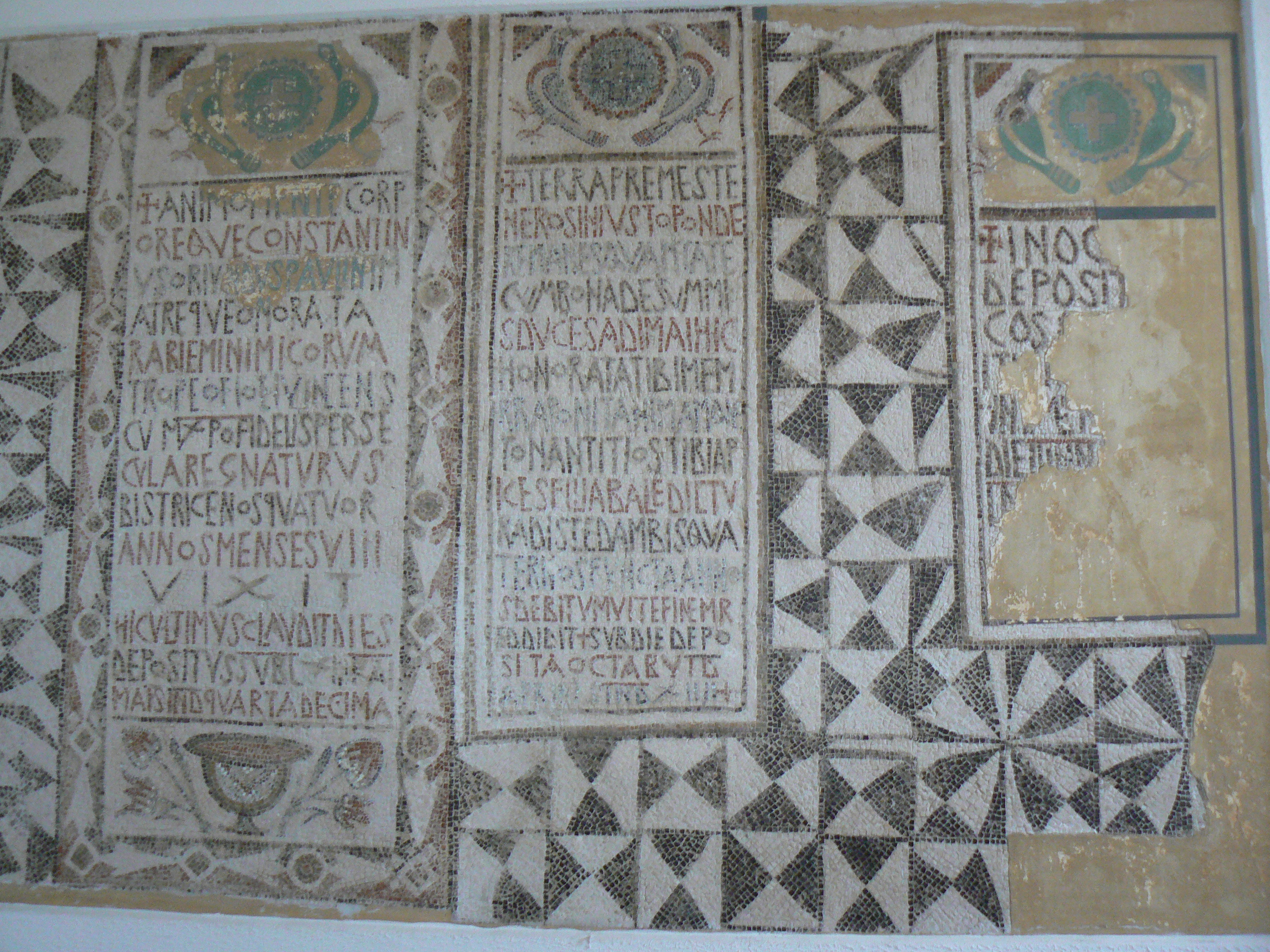
Christian mosaics in the museum.

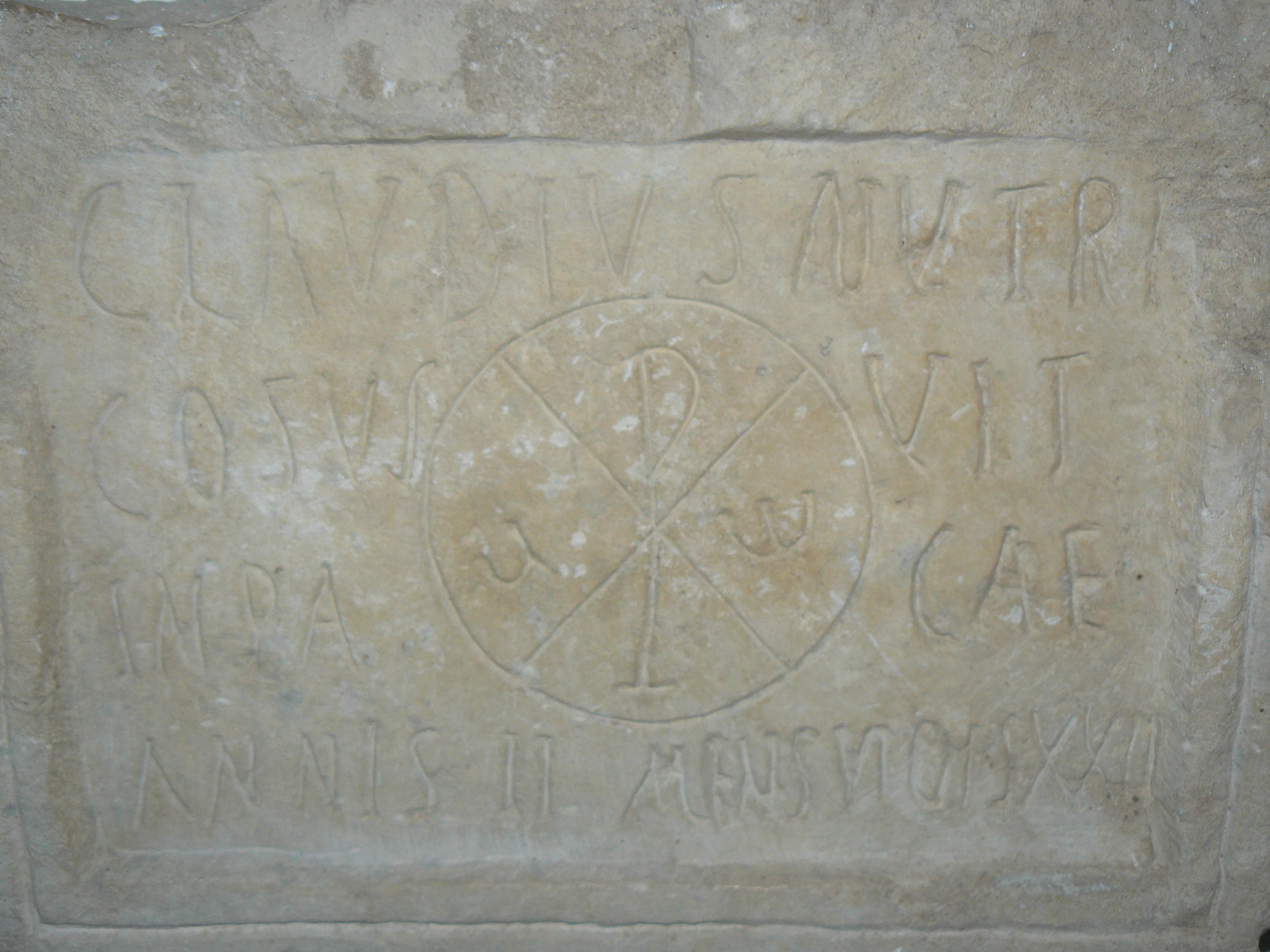
Christian funerary stele with Chi-Rho.

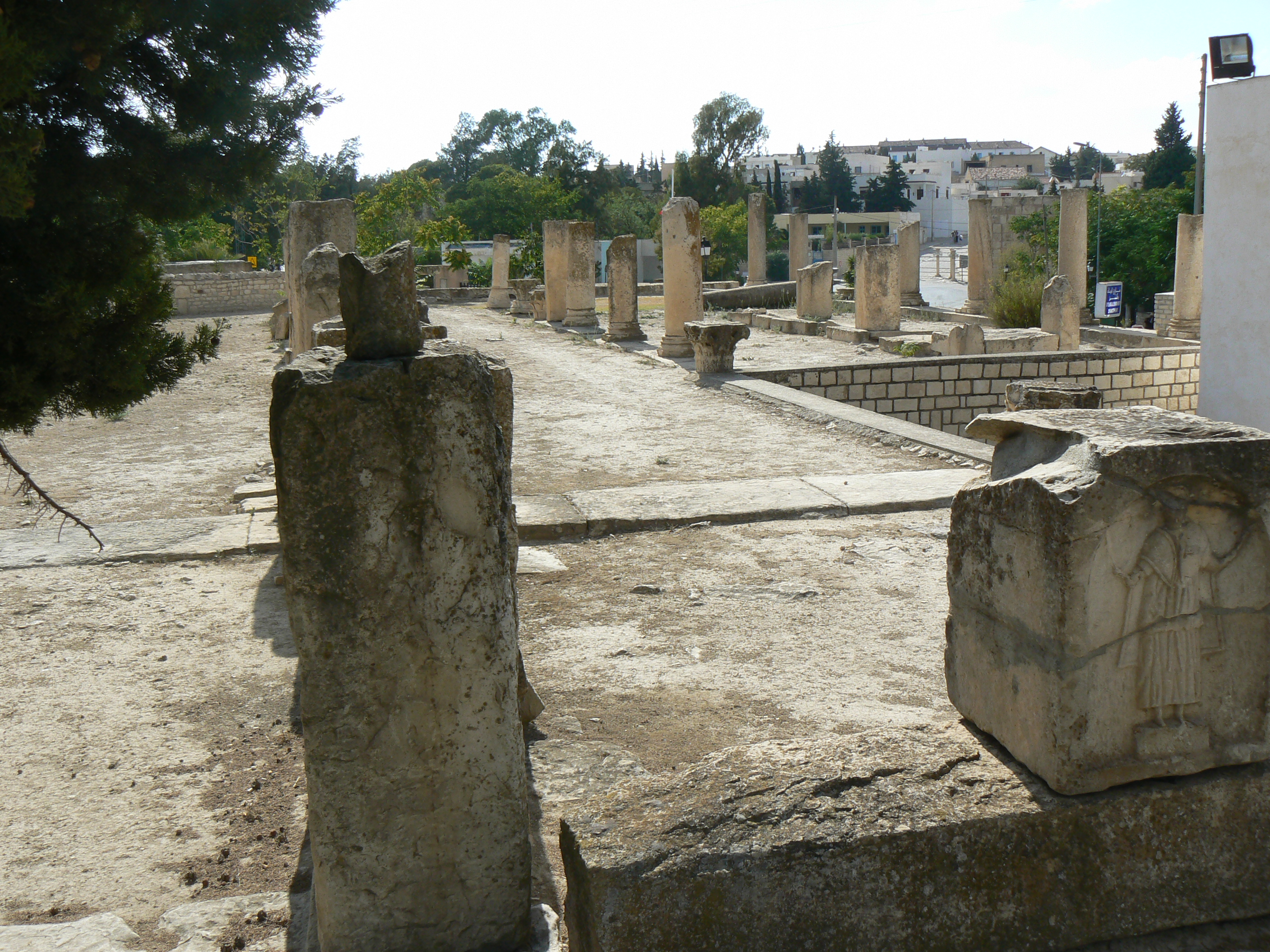
Remains of the "Rutilius" basilica, at the rear of the museum, on the street side.

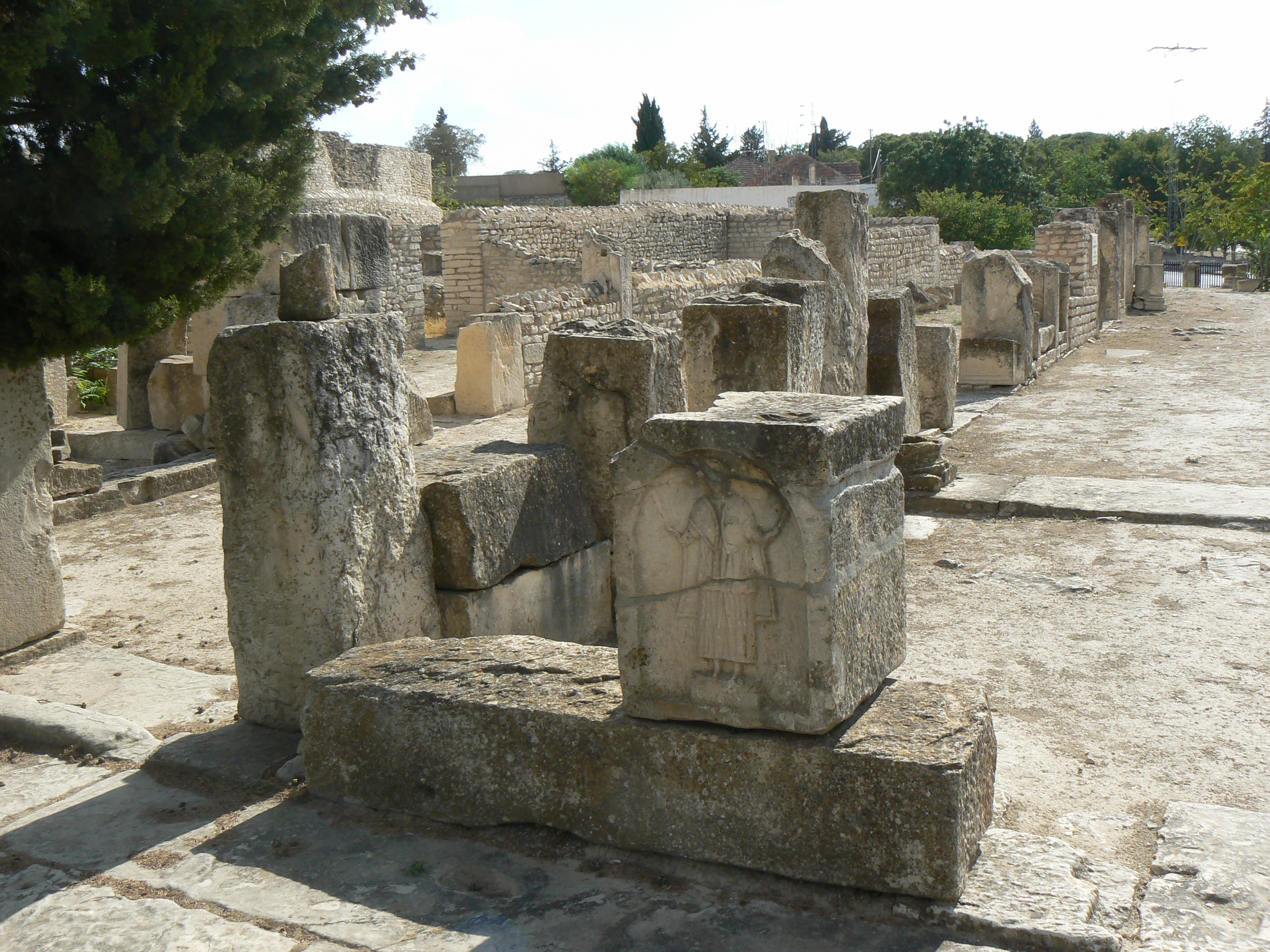
Remains of the annexes to the "Rutilius" basilica, on the amphitheatre side.

== See also ==
- Ancient Carthage

== Bibliography ==
- Hassine Fantar, M'hamed (1982). "De Carthage à Kairouan: 2 000 ans d'art et d'histoire en Tunisie". Association française d'action artistique (Book used to write the article) (in French). Paris.
- Yacoub, Mohamed (1995). "Splendeurs des mosaïques de Tunisie". Agence Nationale du Patrimoine (Book used to write the article) (in French). Tunis.
- Collectif (1994). La Tunisie, carrefour du monde antique (in French). Vol. Les dossiers d'archéologie. Faton. p. 135. ISBN 978-2-87844-020-1.
  - Béjaoui, Féthi (1994). "Les grandes découvertes de l'Antiquité tardive". La Tunisie, carrefour du monde antique (Book used to write the article) (in French). Dijon: Faton. pp. 30–39. ISBN 978-2-87844-020-1.
  - Ouertani, Nayla (1994). "La sculpture romaine". La Tunisie, carrefour du monde antique (Book used to write the article) (in French). Dijon: Faton. pp. 92–101. ISBN 978-2-87844-020-1.
