= Thuburbo Majus =

Archaeological site in Tunisia

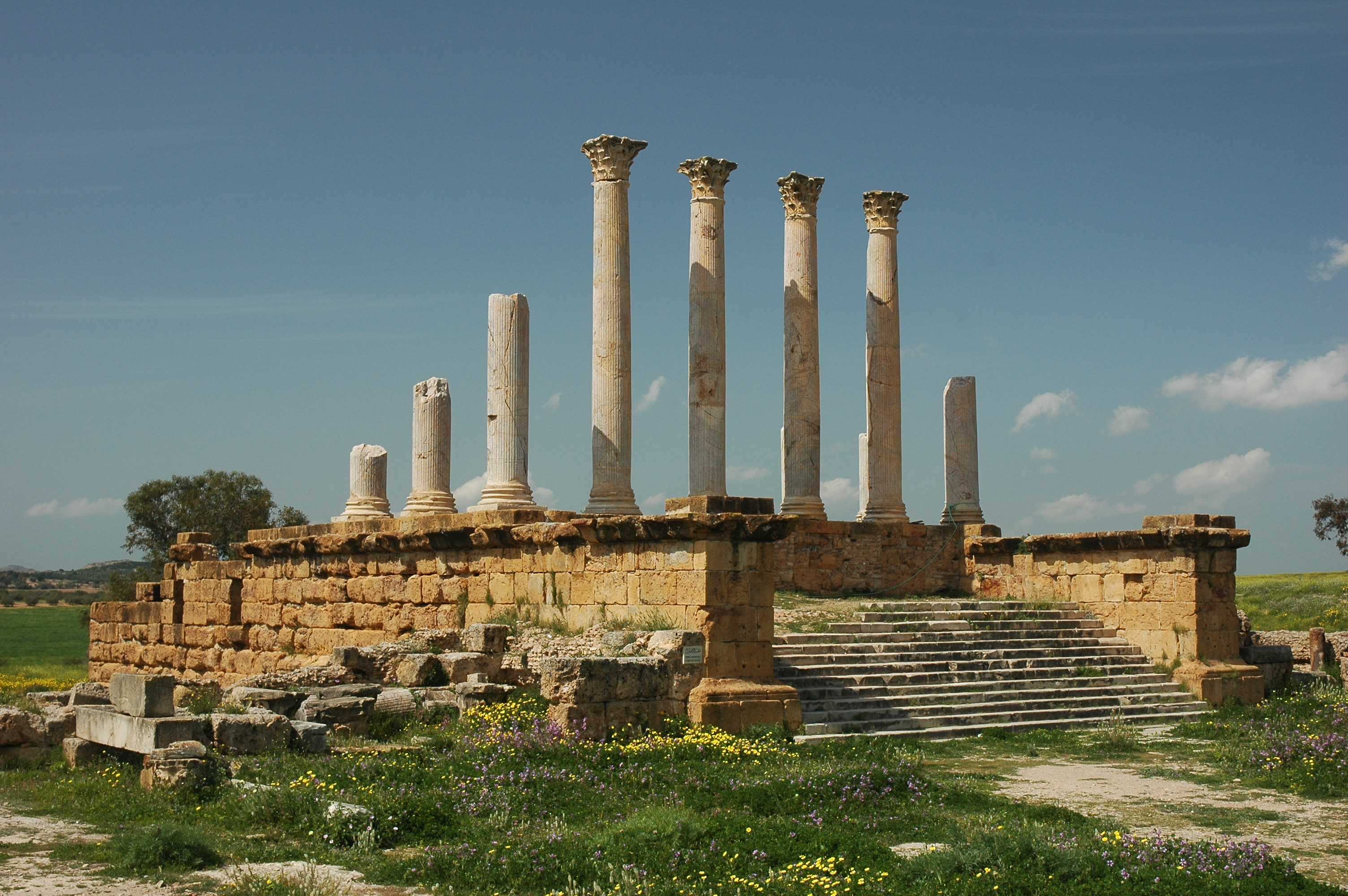
- Ruins of the Capitolium (built 168 A.D.)

- Location within Tunisia
- 36°24′00″N 9°54′15″E
- Type: Archaeological site
- Periods: Antiquity
- Cultures: Berber, Punic, Roman, Vandal, Byzantine
- Satellite of: Roman Empire
- Associated with: Roman veterans, African-Romans, Vandals, Byzantines
- Location: Near El Fahs, Tunisia
- Region: Zaghouan Governorate

History
- Built: 27 B.C. (Roman refounding); originally Punic
- Built by: Augustus (as a Roman colony)
- Abandoned: c. 7th century A.D.

Site notes
- Material: Limestone, marble
- Area: 40 hectares
- Excavation dates: From 1857 (identified by Charles-Joseph Tissot); intensive excavations from 1912
- Archaeologists: Charles-Joseph Tissot, Louis Poinssot
- Condition: Ruined
- Owner: State property
- Management: Agency for the Development of National Heritage and Cultural Promotion (AMVPPC)
- Public access: Yes

Thuburbo Majus (or Thuburbo Maius) is a large Roman site in northern Tunisia. It is located roughly 60 km southwest of Carthage on a major African thoroughfare. This thoroughfare connects Carthage to the Sahara. Other towns along the way included Sbiba, Sufes, Sbeitla, and Sufetula. Parts of the old Roman road are in ruins, but others do remain.

== History ==
Map of the ruins

Thuburbo Majus or Colonia Julia Aurelia Commoda, its Roman name, was originally a Punic town, later founded as a Roman veteran colony by Augustus in 27 BC. Military veterans were sent to Thuburbo, among other sites, by Augustus to allow them to start their post-army lives with land of their own. Its strategic location and access to trade routes made it an important establishment. Ruins of the town are in the middle of the countryside with no towns in close proximity.

Most of the town was built around 150–200 and restored in the 4th century after the Crisis of the Third Century. It received a Capitolium in 168. The town was a productive grower of grain, olives, and fruit. Under Hadrian it was made a municipium, helping cause a growth in wealth, and Commodus made it a colony. The early third century Christian martyr Perpetua was born in the town.

== Excavations ==
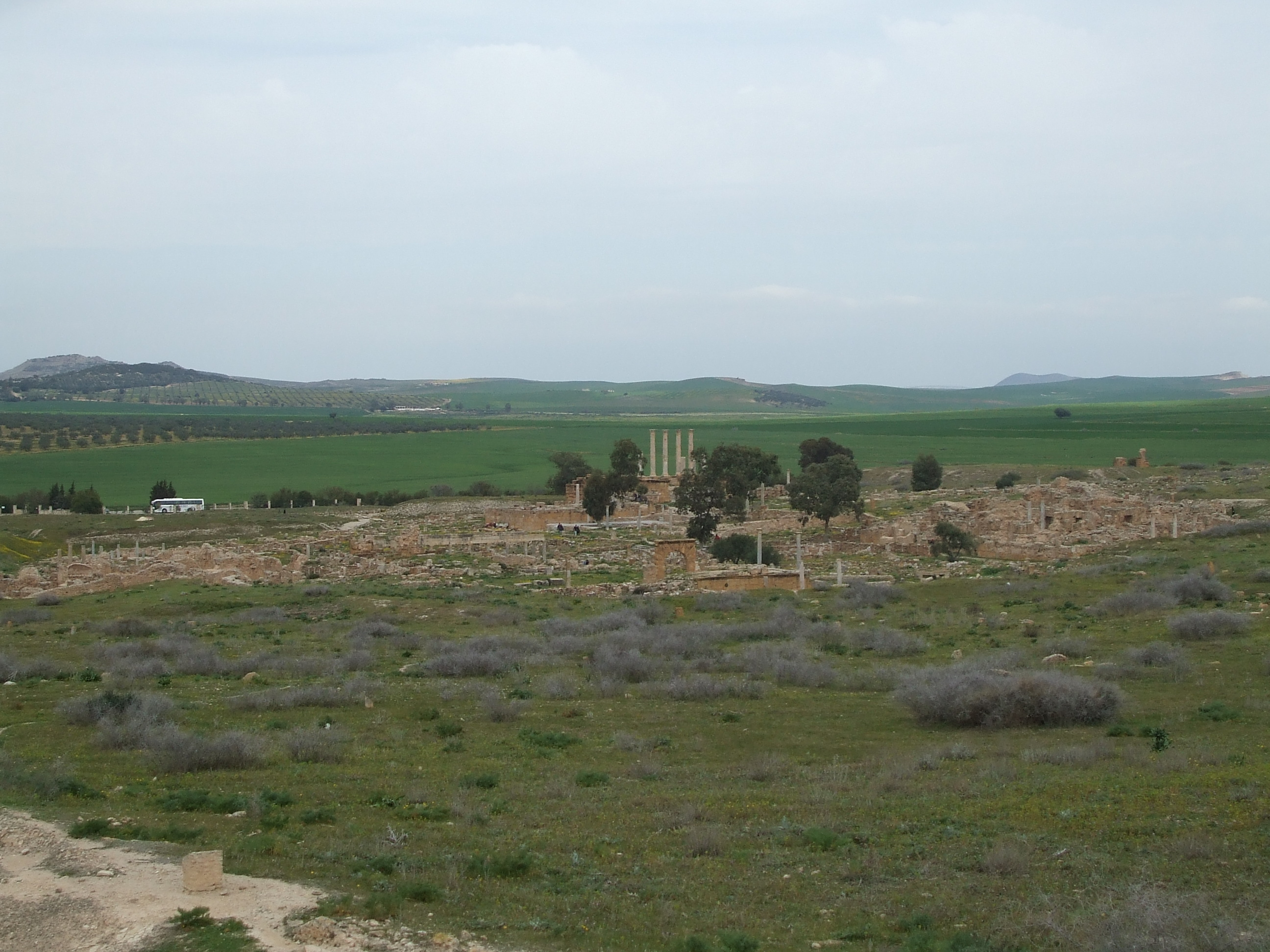
Panoramic view of Thuburbo Majus

A 1916 excavation found a tetrastyle temple. The building was decorated with statues of Apollo, Venus, Silvanus, Bacchus, the Dioscuri, and a satyr. Three perfume vases showed dogs pursuing rabbits.

In 1920 an inscription found in Thuburbo Majus written in honor of C. Vettius Sabinianus proved that several other inscriptions bearing that name were referring to the same person.

Remains of the house of Bacchus and Ariadne dating back to the early 5th century were excavated in 1925. Researchers found the town to be a valuable site, as evidence of food preparation in a garden was discovered. Those and other finds point to what daily life in ancient Rome might have been like. Mosaics found in the town date to the late 4th century. These mosaics depict items from nature, like a still life arrangement of food items and a sea filled with fish as young people fish from boats. They have been studied by archaeologist Aïcha Ben Abed. Another mosaic represents a nude Venus riding a chariot, with plant life surrounding her to represent well-being and fertility.

This town does not have fully restored buildings, but there are remains of a forum, the amphitheatre, temples, baths, houses, and other sites.

== Bishopric ==
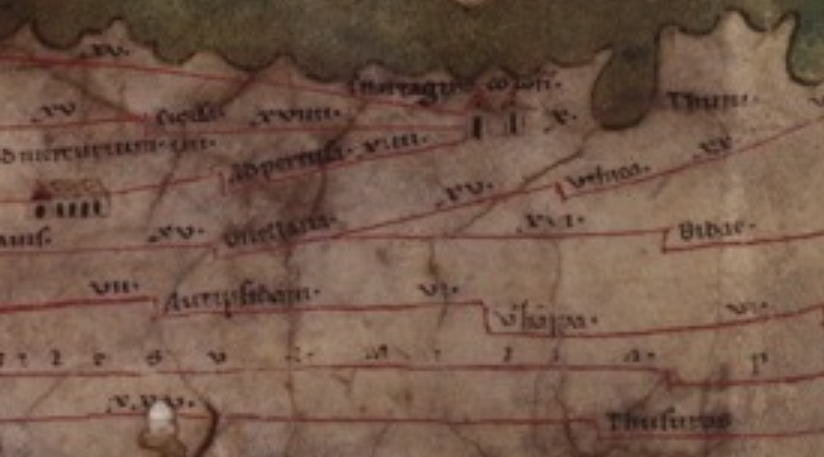
extract of the Tabula Peutingeriana showing Thuburbo, Roman North Africa, during 4th century.

The Bishopric was founded during the Roman Empire and survived through the Arian Vandal and Orthodox Byzantine empires, only ceasing to function with the Muslim conquest of the Maghreb. The diocese was refounded in name at least in the 20th century. Known bishops include:

- Sedatus, present at the Council of Carthage (256),
- Faustus, at the Council of Arles (314),
- Catholic Bishop Cyprianus, at the Council of Carthage (411),
- Donatist Bishop Rufinus, at the Council of Carthage, 411,
- Benenatus, exiled by the Vandal king Huneric, 484.
