= Sabatino Moscati =

Italian archaeologist and linguist (1922–1997)

- Born: 24 November 1922; Rome
- Died: 8 September 1997 (aged 74); Rome
- Occupations: Archaeologist; Linguist
- Employer: University of Rome
- Known for: Archaeology and linguistics, work on Phoenician and Punic civilizations
- Awards: Lamarmora Prize, Selinon Prize, Sybaris Magna Grecia Prize, I cavalli d'oro di San Marco

Sabatino Moscati (24 November 1922 – 8 September 1997) was an Italian archaeologist and linguist known for his work on Phoenician and Punic civilisations. In 1954 he became Professor of Semitic Philology at the University of Rome where he established the Institute of Studies of the Near East.

Sabatino directed a number of excavations, in the process of which he established himself internationally, winning the Lamarmora Prize for his studies of Sardinia, the Selinon Prize for Sicily, the Sybaris Magna Grecia Prize for his research in ancient Italy and the I cavalli d'oro di San Marco for his oriental work.

== Bibliography ==
- The Face of the Ancient Orient (1962)
- The World of the Phoenicians (1968) English trans., Weidenfeld & Nicolson "History of Civilisation" series
- Moscati, Sabatino; Bisi, Anna Maria (1989). Storia universale dell'arte (in Italian). Torino: UTET. ISBN 978-8802042381.
- The Phoenicians, 2001, I. B. Tauris, ISBN 978-1-85043-533-4
