= Bardo National Museum =

Bardo National Museum or Musée National du Bardo may refer to:

- Bardo National Museum (Algiers) in Algeria
- Bardo National Museum (Tunis) in Tunisia
