= Cultural relations =

Cultural relations are reciprocal, non-coercive transnational interactions between two or more cultures, encompassing a range of activities that are conducted both by state and non-state actors within the space of cultural and civil society. The overall outcomes of cultural relations are greater connectivity, better mutual understanding, more and deeper relationships, mutually beneficial transactions and enhanced sustainable dialogue between states, peoples, non-state actors and cultures.

Through public policy tools such as public diplomacy and cultural diplomacy (state to people relations), strategic communication and conditionality (including policies of mass persuasion and propaganda), countries and state sponsored institutions rely on non-state actors and culture with the aim of promoting and strengthening their foreign policy interests and influencing perceptions and preferences.

Cultural relations can be distinguished from state led activities such as public diplomacy; cultural diplomacy and nation branding, in that they do not originate only from policies of state actors; through the range of institutions and non-state actors involved pursuing their own goals as transnational actors and by their reciprocity. They are, however, a tangible component of International Relations in the sense that they encompass the space in which a wide range of non-state actors engage in the fostering of intercultural dialogue which can be either in favour of, or against, the national interests of state actors.

== Cultural relations and theory ==
This definition follows Chrisine Silvester's concept of critical imaginations (see the book Critical Imaginations in International Relations, 2016) as she argues that traditional International Relations imagines worlds mostly through the linking of concepts or data points, leaving the field with a certain social hollowness at the core of the canon, an emptiness where people, who are going about their lives experiencing and influencing international relations, should be. She argues that much of International Relations lacks the creativity necessary to place itself in the world of people. The concept of cultural relations fills that void. As cultural relations are engaged in the shaping of preferences of others through appeal and attraction, this distinct field fits into Joseph Nye’s popular theoretical concept of soft power (see Bound to Lead: The Changing Nature of American Power, 1990) denoting the ability to attract and co-opt rather than coerce (using force or giving money as a means of persuasion).

== Culture ==
Consisting of both direct and indirect interactions between cultures, cultural relations do not fit as comfortably into an academic field as state actors do into International Relations, Economics and Politics. Direct cultural interactions denote both physical and virtual encounters with people and objects of another culture. Indirect cultural interactions involve ideas, values and beliefs proper to a specific culture and often featured in philosophy, literature, music, and art that are acting as cross-national tools, which can foster and strengthen intercultural dialogue. An understanding of cultural relations therefore requires an understanding of contemporary cultures, at both the global and local levels. These cultures include the range of activities and practices of those engaged in cultural governance and policy, production, dissemination and economics. This includes the political, economic and social roles of culture in cultural markets, development, institutions and specific contexts.

== Cultural relations and digital communications media ==
Due to the increasing pervasiveness of ongoing developments in digital communication and social media networks, which greatly facilitate these processes of global cultural production, participation and dialogue, the importance of direct and indirect cultural relations is growing and developing. Digital media enable cultural and civic societies to engage in cultural relations beyond the boundaries of traditional non-hard state power, i.e. cultural and public diplomacy.

== The range of practitioners of cultural relations ==
Cultural relations both produce and diffuse (soft) power, which varies depending on who is engaging with it. First and foremost, cultural relations are conducted through the enormous range of non-state actors engaged transnationally. The range includes cities, global civil society, educational institutions, cultural and arts organisations, research institutes, corporations and businesses, even down to individuals who can engage via the Internet. This does not mean, however, that state actors are excluded from the field of cultural relations. There is necessarily an ongoing interaction between the field of cultural relations and a state's foreign policy, given the scale and importance of cultural relations activity, which dwarfs state driven policies in quantity, frequency, inclusiveness and speed. These characteristics of scale, the prominence of the digital, the range from formal to informal actors, generate a need for new forms of evidence, descriptions and theorisation.

== Categorization ==
Soft power – public diplomacy – cultural diplomacy – International Relations
