= Maghrawa (Tunisia) =

Coordinates: 35.914°N 9.146°E

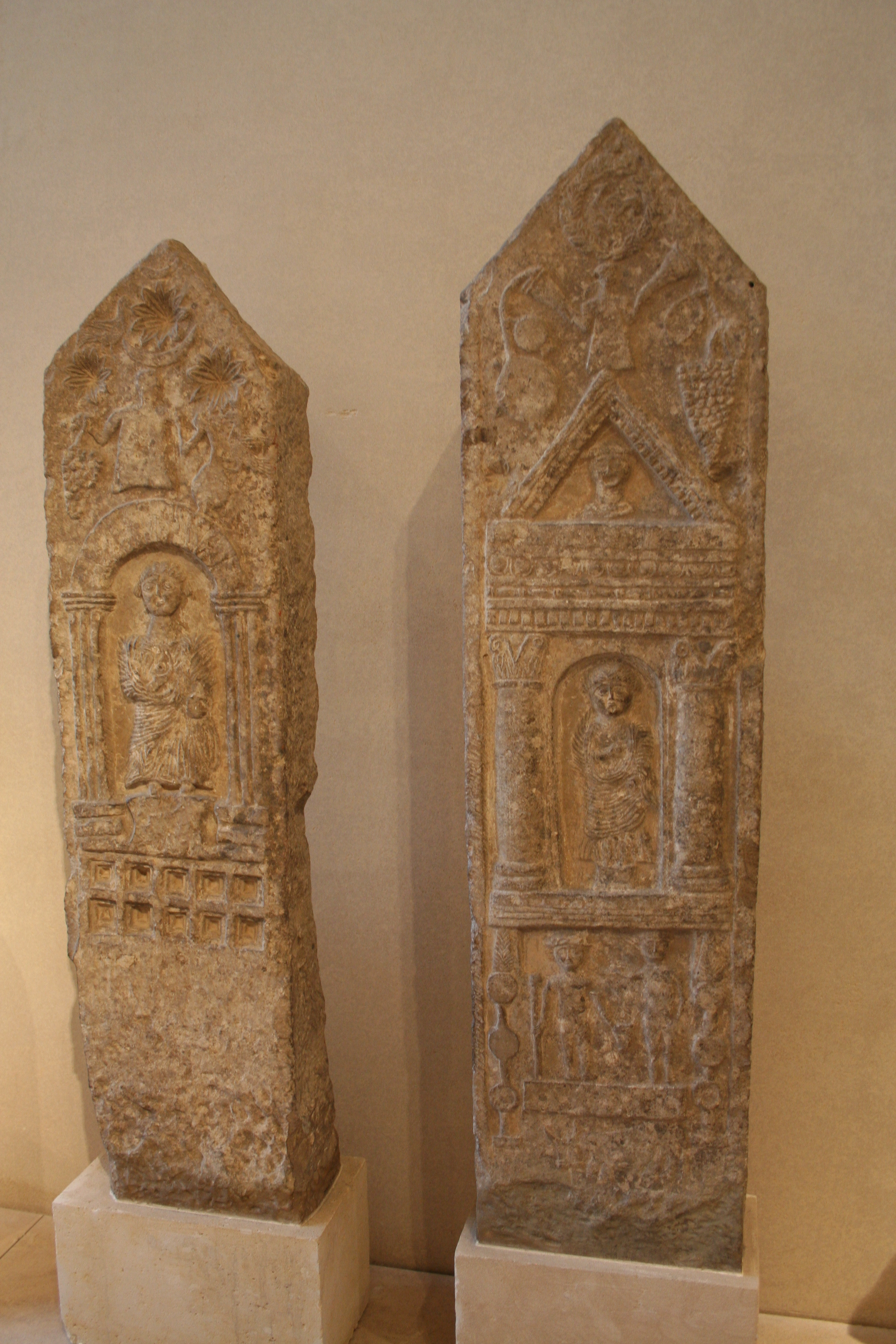
La Ghorfa stelae in the Louvre.

Maghrawa, Magraoua (مغراوة) or Aïn Maghrawa (عين مغراوة) is an archeological site in Tunisia, located in the Maktar region.

The ancient city of Macota was located on this site. Ahmed M'Charek has demonstrated that this was the origin of a series of stelae that have been mistakenly referred to as the La Ghorfa stelae (Roman-era stelae—1st and 2nd centuries AD—which bear witness to a Punic substratum).

The Atlas archéologique de la Tunisie wrote as follows:

125. Magraoua. Agglomération importante. Monuments mégalithiques; inscriptions libyques et latines (Denis, Bull. arch. du Comité, 1893, p. 138 et suiv.; C. 1. L., VIII, p. 89 et 1229).

== See also ==
- Mididi

== Bibliography ==
- Ahmed M'Charek, « Maghrawa, lieu de provenance des stèles punico-numides dites de la Ghorfa », Mélanges de l'École française de Rome, vol. 100, n°2, 1988, pp. 731-760
- Ahmed M'Charek, « Maghrawa, antique Macota (Tunisie) », Antiquités africaines, vol. 33, 1997, pp. 119-127
