= Aïcha Ben Abed =

Tunisian historian and archaeologist

Aïcha Ben Abed (alternatively Aïcha Ben Abed-Ben Khedher Arabic: عائشة بن عابد) is an archaeologist and Director of Monuments and Sites at the Institut National du Patrimoine, Tunisia. She is specialized in the mosaics of Roman Africa.

== Education ==
Abed graduated from Aix-Marseille University in 1979 with a doctorate in art and archaeology. Her post-doctoral award is from Paris IV-Sorbonne.

== Career ==
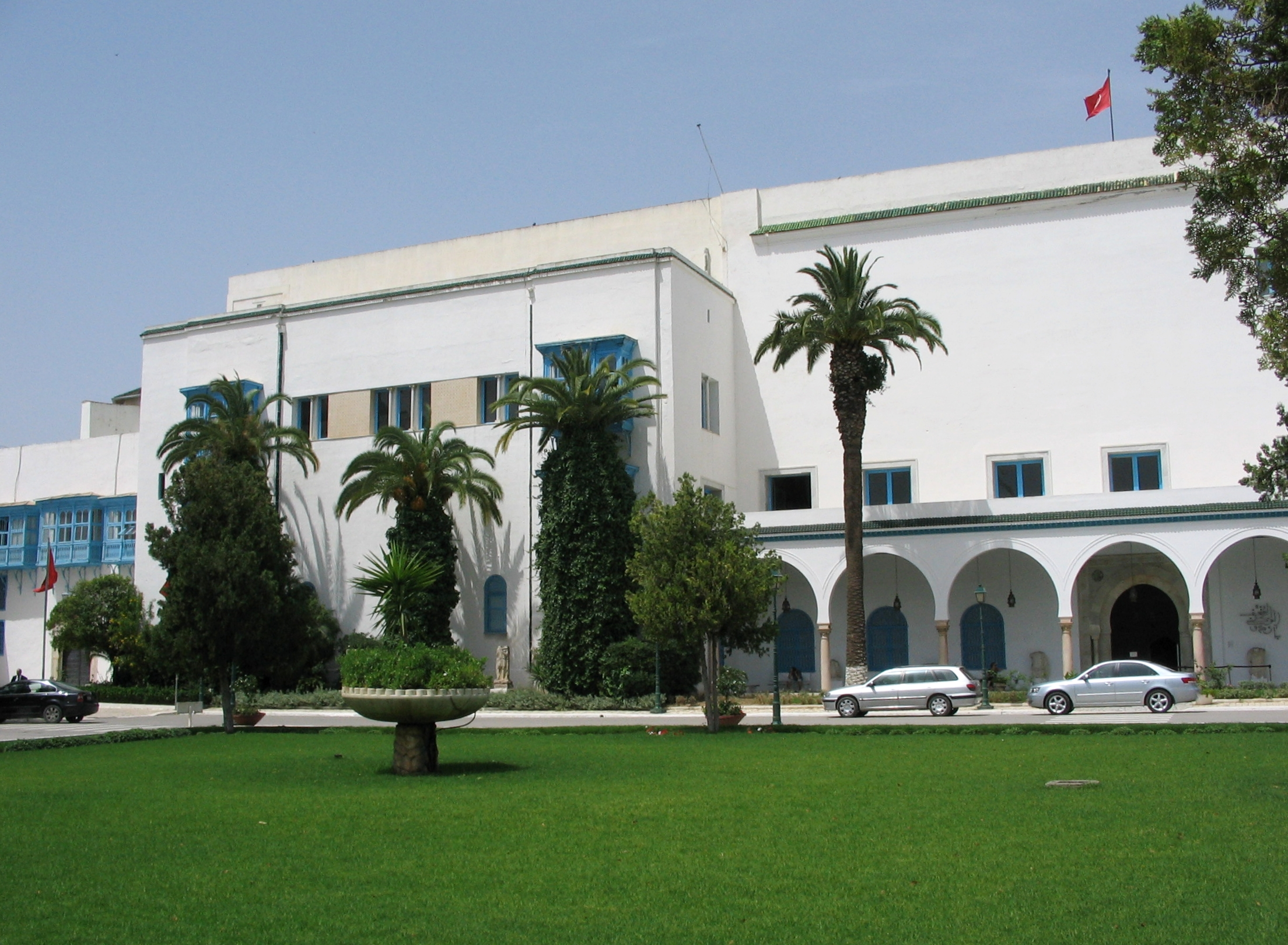
Bardo National Museum

Abed has held a number of positions during her career, including as from 1986 to 1991 as Director of the Bardo Museum in Tunis. She is a specialist in Roman mosaics, particularly in Tunisia and was the first person to study the conservation of re-buried mosaics. Abed is working with international partners to secure the future and safety of Tunisia's important mosaics, whilst recognising the differences in resourcing that lie between the western museum world and the Mediterranean.

Thuburbo Majus - plan in French

Abed has spent her career encouraging the study of mosaics in Tunisia and has written widely on their history and conservation. She has worked on the mosaics from Thurburbo Majus, a Roman town 60 km from Carthage. She worked on the establishment of Chemtou Museum, an important site for marble quarrying in Tunisia.

Abed has worked as a consultant on the mosaics of Berytus, Roman remains in Beirut. She has worked on the Roman remains at Pupput, with an emphasis on how homes and other domestic spaces were organised. She has worked on the Roman spa complex at Djebel Oust, studying its origins, as well as the mosaics that were built there. She also worked on the curation of the Roman site at Jedidi.

== Personal life ==
Abed was married to Tunisian activist Noureddine Ben Khedher. Kheder died on 10 February 2005. They had three children.
